= Hekatompedon =

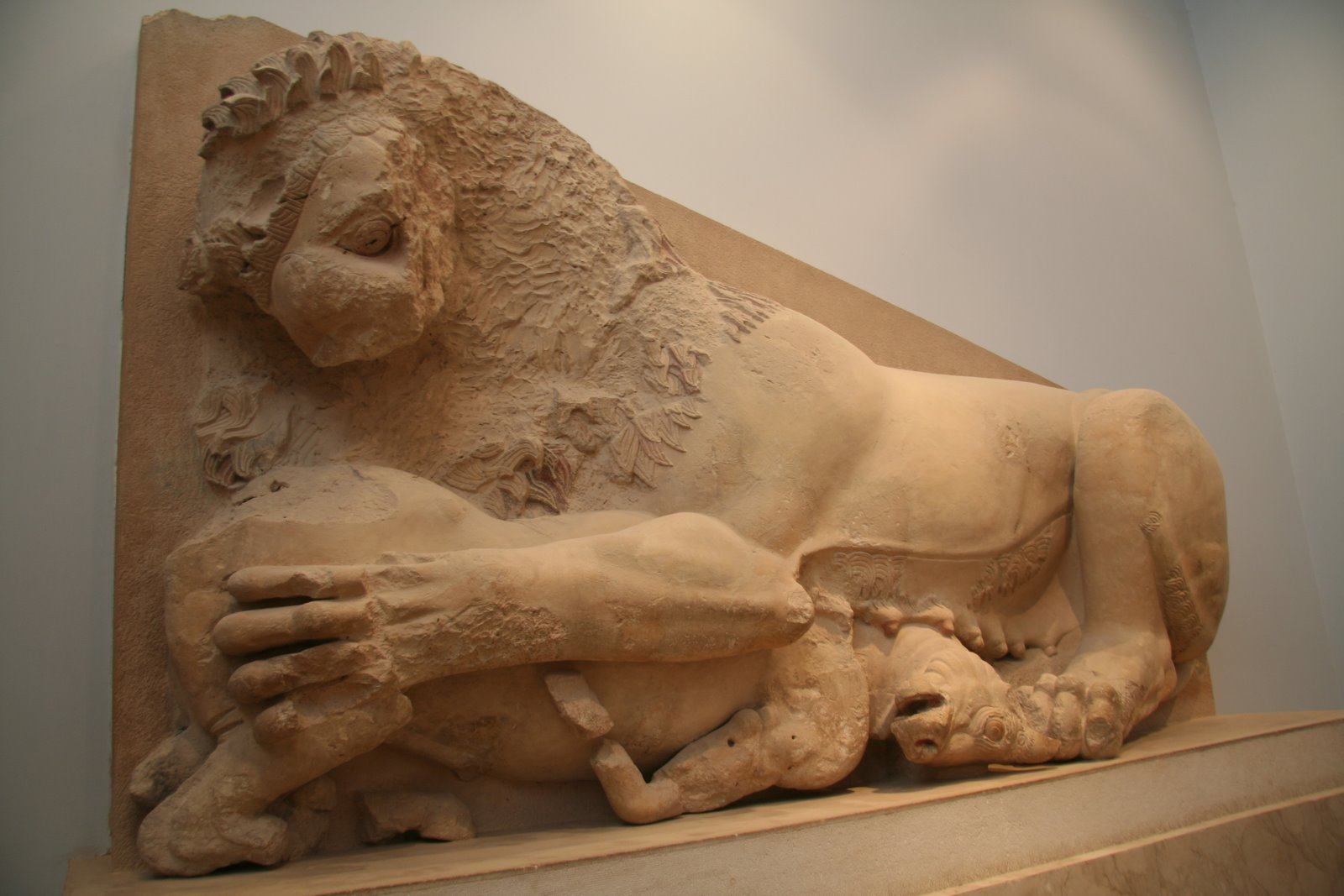
- Sculpture from the east pediment center depicting a lioness killing a calf

- Location within Greece

General information
- Type: Temple for the worship of Athena
- Architectural style: Ancient Greek Archaic
- Location: Athens, Greece
- Coordinates: 37.9715°N 23.7267°E
- Current tenants: Museum
- Construction started: ca. 570 BC
- Completed: ca. 550 BC
- Destroyed: 490 BC
- Owner: Greek government

The Hekatompedon or Hekatompedos (Ancient Greek: ἑκατόμπεδος, from ἑκατόν, "hundred", and πούς, "foot"), also known as Ur-Parthenon and H–Architektur, was an ancient Greek temple on the Acropolis of Athens built from limestone in the Archaic period, and it was located in the position of the present Parthenon.

== Etymology ==
The name of the temple, "Hekatompedon", was found in inscriptions and is translated as “one hundred feet long”. Differing significantly from modern measurement systems, the length of their "foot" measurement may be seen by comparison: in modern measurements the length of the temple was 46 meters (whereas, using a modern measurement, their "one hundred feet" would only amount to approximately 30 meters).

== History ==
This temple was built around 570–550 BC by the Athenians. They then demolished the Hekatompedon in 490 BC after their victory over an invasion by Persians at the Battle of Marathon in order to celebrate the victory by building a larger temple (that later would become known as the Older Parthenon). The latter temple was destroyed in 480 BC during the Second Persian invasion of Greece when the returning Persians destroyed Athens, and finally, the temple that the Persians destroyed was replaced with the present Parthenon.

The existence of the Hekatompedon is witnessed by historical documents. Its foundations have disappeared, but architectural and sculptural elements found in the southern part of the Mycenaean wall of Acropolis of Athens have been assigned by scholars to this early temple.

== Archaeology ==
As with many other archaeological findings on the Acropolis, the initial descriptions of Hekatompedon in the late nineteenth century were based only on architectural and sculptural fragments. In that limited context, Hekatompedon was known as H-Architektur in descriptions and cataloguing, next to other buildings such as A–, B–Architektur, etc.

The description of the temple as well as its presumed location have changed over time with the advancement of archaeological methods and techniques and knowledge gained through further discoveries.

The first descriptions were by Wilhelm Dörpfeld. Dörpfeld had assigned all fragments to the neighbouring Old Temple of Athena that stood between the still standing Erechtheum and Parthenon.

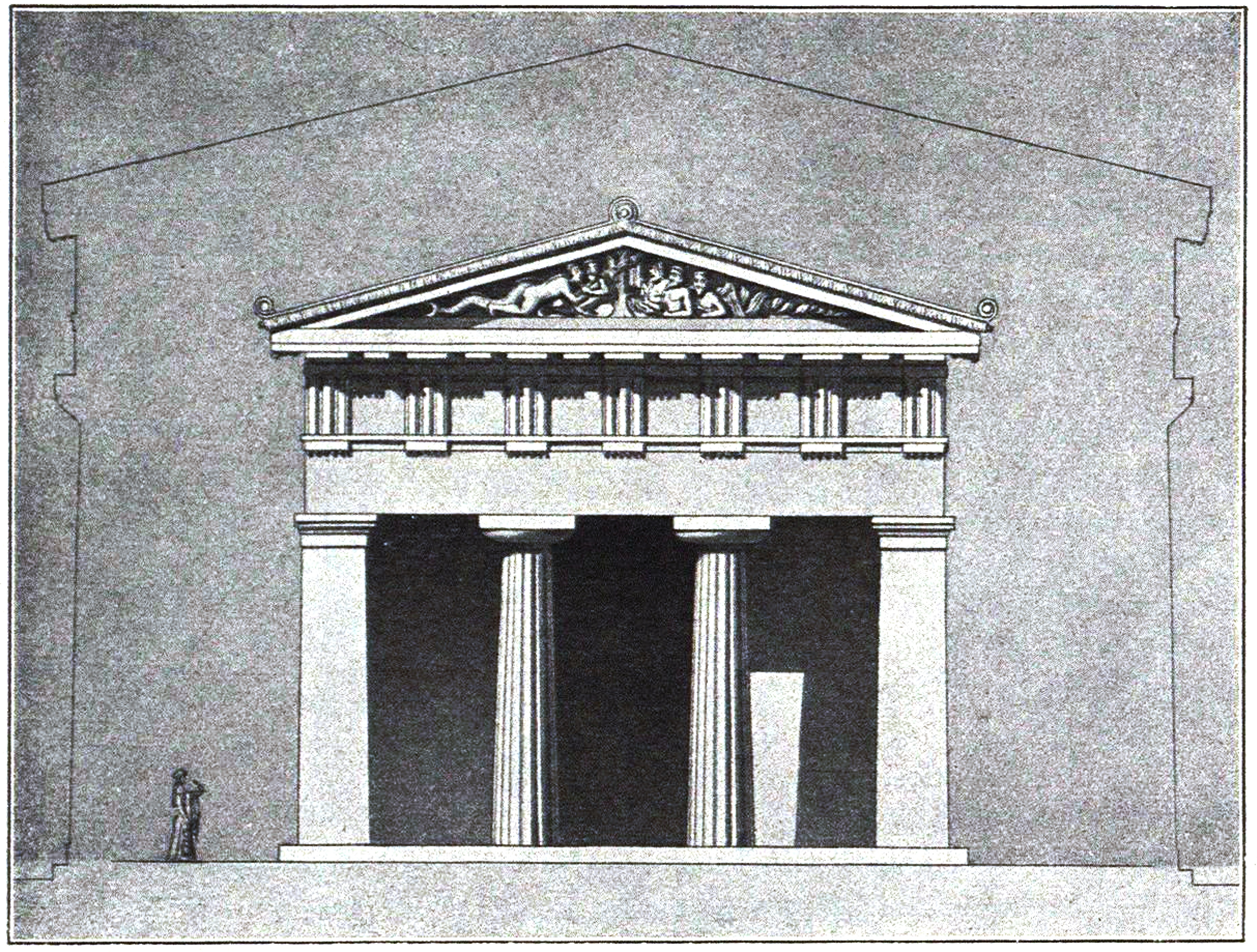
An obsolete conjectural elevation of the Hekatompedon suggested by Theodor Wiegand in 1905

Theodor Wiegand hypothesized in 1904 that H–Architektur was a non-peripteros temple located on the site of the Old Temple of Athena, and was in fact an earlier stage of the Old Temple that was later expanded with a peristasis. Moreover, he identified H–Architektur as the Hekatompedon mentioned in ancient inscriptions.

However, in 1922, Ernst Buschor proposed that H–Architektur had been located to the south, on the site of the still standing Parthenon and he identified the earlier structure as Ur-Parthenon, German for "original Parthenon".

In 1936, Walter-Herwig Schuchhardt's extensive research on the surviving fragments and sculptures proved that the pediments of the temple must have been larger than earlier presumed. As a result, he reconstructed a peripteros temple instead of the previous reconstructions that included a distyle or tristyle in antis temple.

Further research by William Bell Dinsmoor, Immo Beyer, and others, as well as historical correlations between the surviving fragments and the destruction of the Acropolis by the Persians in 480 BC have led to the current hypothesis that Hekatompedon was a hexastyle peripteral Doric temple with a 46-metre long crepidoma and that was located on the site of Parthenon.

== Pediments ==
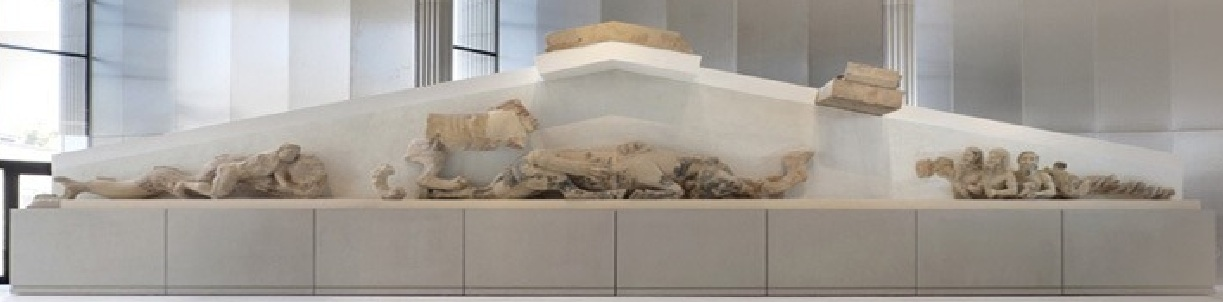
Display of the fragments of the West pediment

The pediments were colourfully painted and their porous limestone has allowed the ancient paint to survive well. One of the pediments (likely the West pediment) contained two lionesses tearing apart a bull in the centre. On the left Herakles fights against Triton and on the right he fights with the Three-bodied (Triple-bodied) Daemon with the symbols of the three elements of nature in his hands.

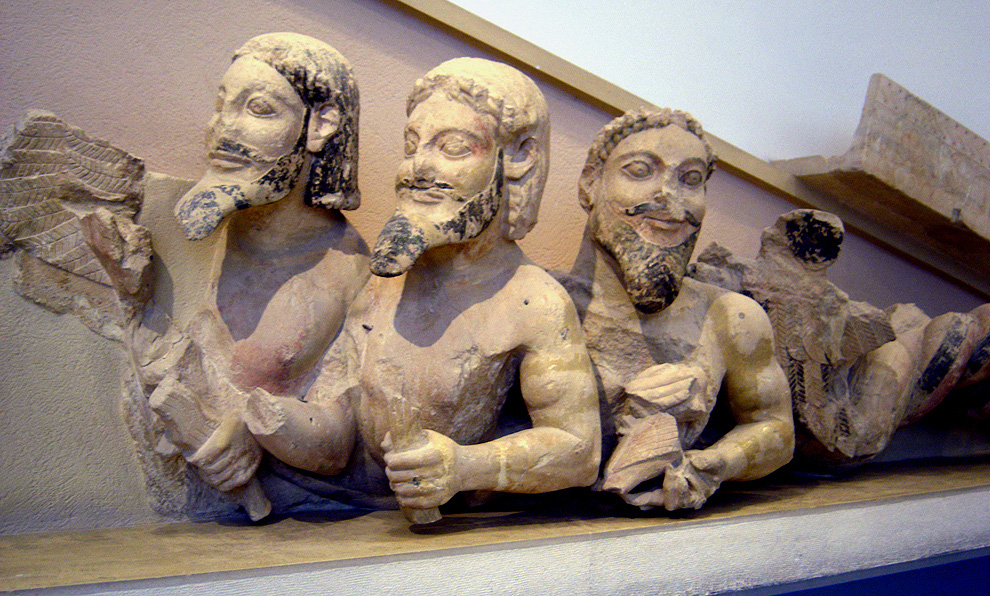
Detail of the West pediment, the Three-bodied Daemon

The three upper bodies of the winged monster hold a wave, a flame, and a bird. The lower portion of the figure has intertwined snake tails thought to symbolize the four natural elements, i.e. water, fire, air, and earth, respectively. The figure is thought to represent either Nereus or Typhon.

Overall the meaning of the whole pediment is mysterious due to a lack of understanding of earlier religious beliefs. Some scholars speculate that it means the dominance of the human wisdom over elements represented through water deities: the lions are earth animals, whereas the bull represents water creatures. In addition, both Triton and Nereus were sea creatures defeated by Herakles on the way to the Hesperides garden, which earned him immortality.

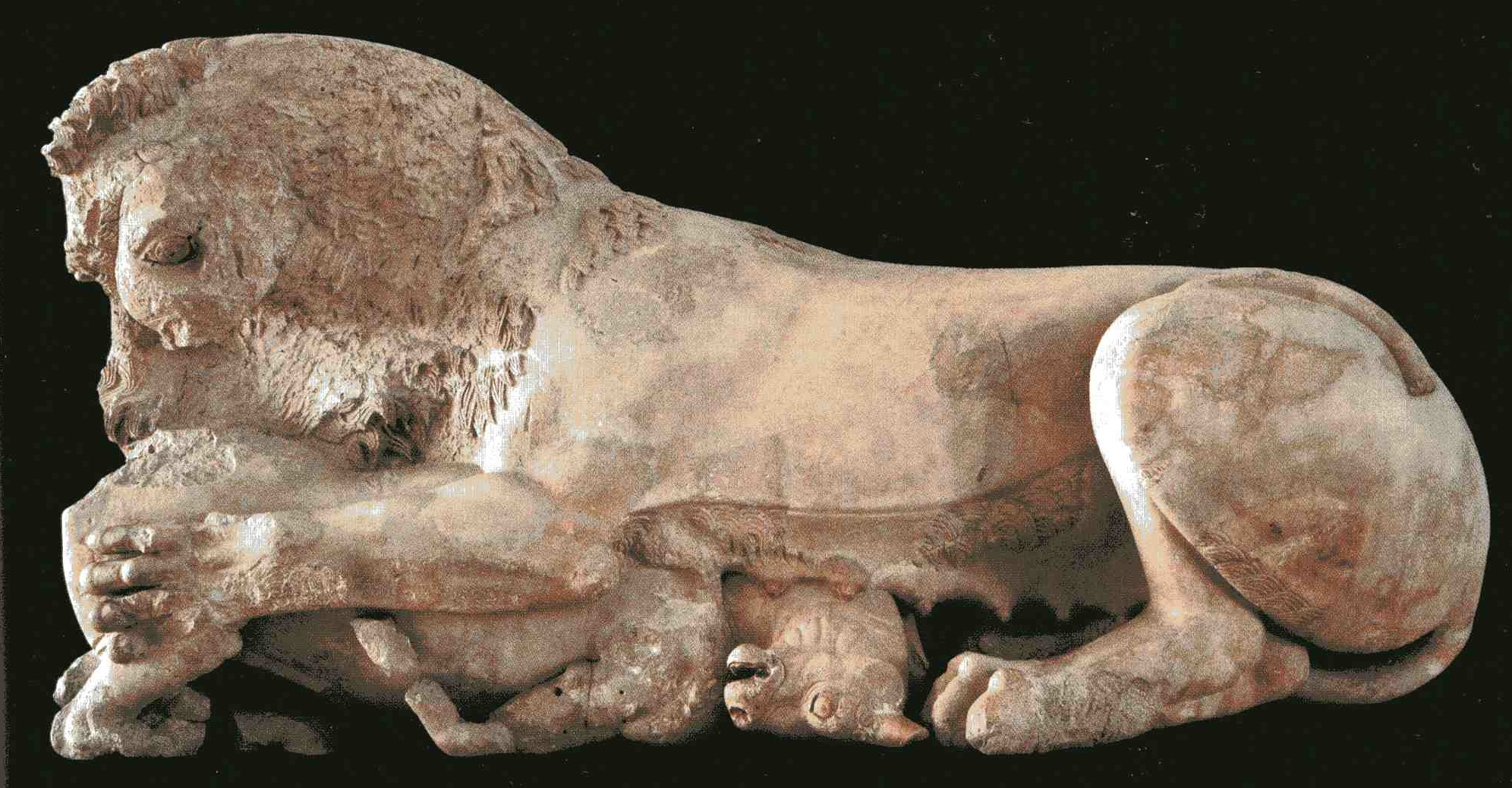
Lioness at the centre of the East pediment

The East pediment, also known as the Lioness pediment, contains two in the centre, who are killing a calf (only one has been recovered) and two snakes flanking the lionesses on the side corners. The meaning of this scene is again, unknown without certain knowledge of the ancient religious beliefs of these ancient peoples.

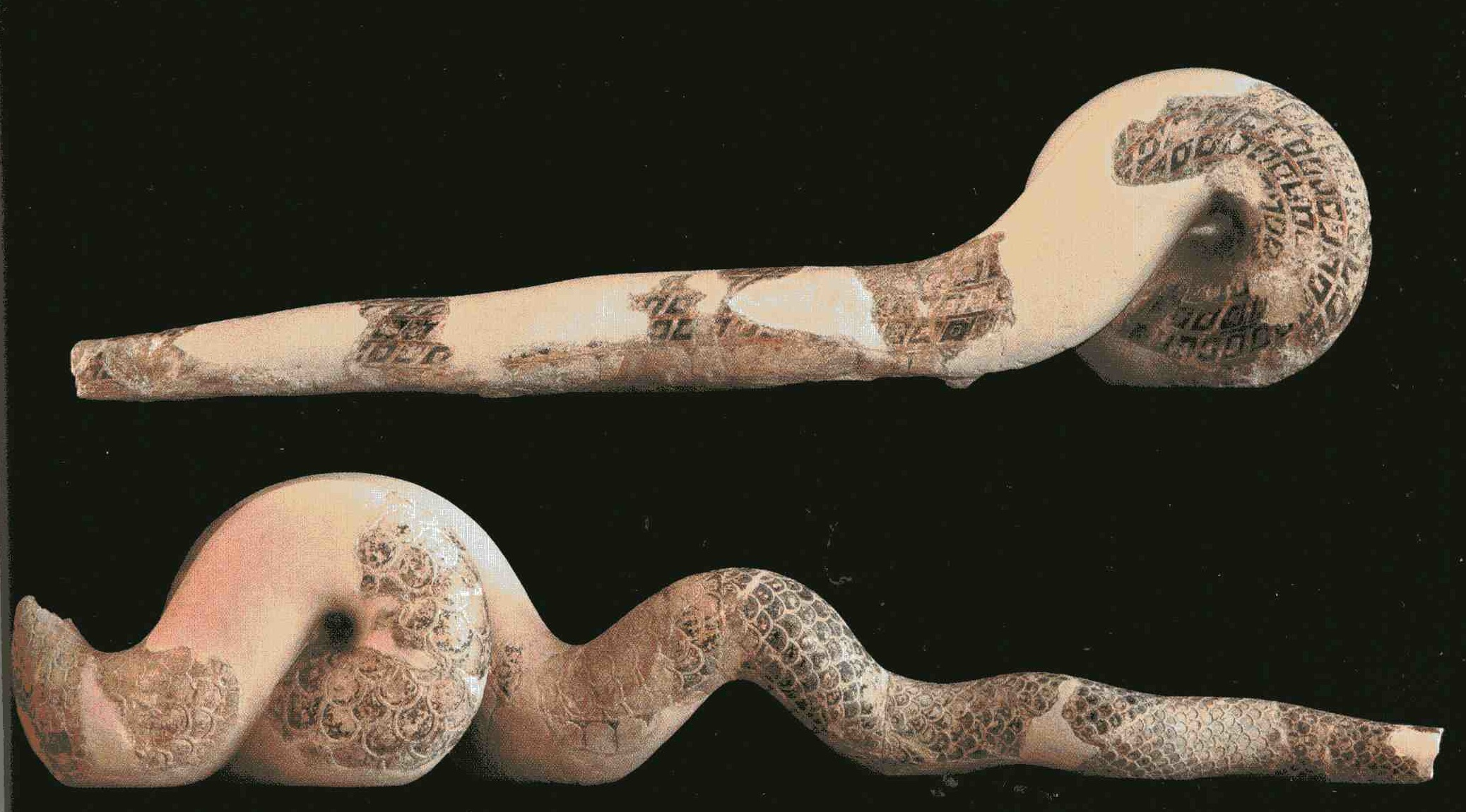
Snake fragments - right and left corners of the East pediment

Other surviving sculptures include four horses and more lionesses carved in relief, both from metopes of the temple, and a very fragmentary gorgon from the central akroterion.

=== Style ===
The style of the sculptures is typical of the early Archaic period. The overall narrative scenes of the pediments and metopes is half narrative, including human or semi-human figures, half animal, including animals placed in a symmetrical or repetitive fashion. This also is a characteristic of the illustrations on the contemporary ancient Greek pottery. Humans in this ancient artwork were depicted consistently with what is called the archaic smile and is interpreted variously by modern authors.

== See also ==
- New Acropolis Museum
- Perserschutt
