= Old Temple of Athena =

Ancient temple on the Athenian Acropolis

Coordinates: 37.9715°N 23.7267°E

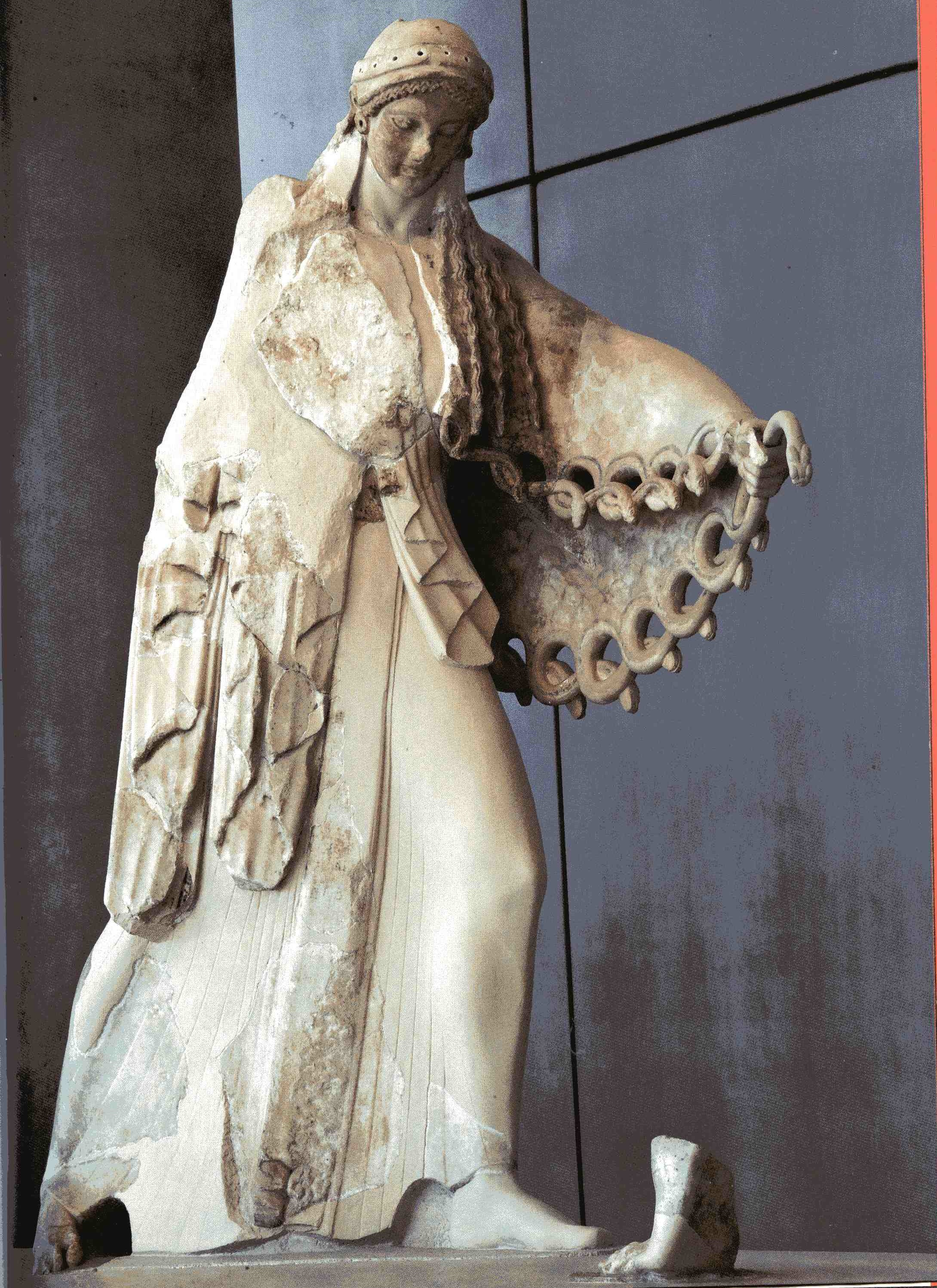
Athena, central figure of the pediment of the temple, Acropolis Museum, Akr. 631

The Old Temple of Athena or the Archaios Neos (Greek: Ἀρχαῖος Νεώς) was an archaic Greek limestone Doric temple on the Acropolis of Athens probably built in the second half of the sixth-century BCE, and which housed the xoanon of Athena Polias. The existence of an archaic temple to Athena had long been conjectured from literary references until the discovery of substantial building foundations under the raised terrace between the Erechtheion and Parthenon in 1886 confirmed it. While it is uncontroversial that a temple stood on the central acropolis terrace in the late archaic period and was burnt down in the Persian invasion of 480 BC, nevertheless questions of its nature, name, reconstruction and duration remain unresolved.

== Evidence ==
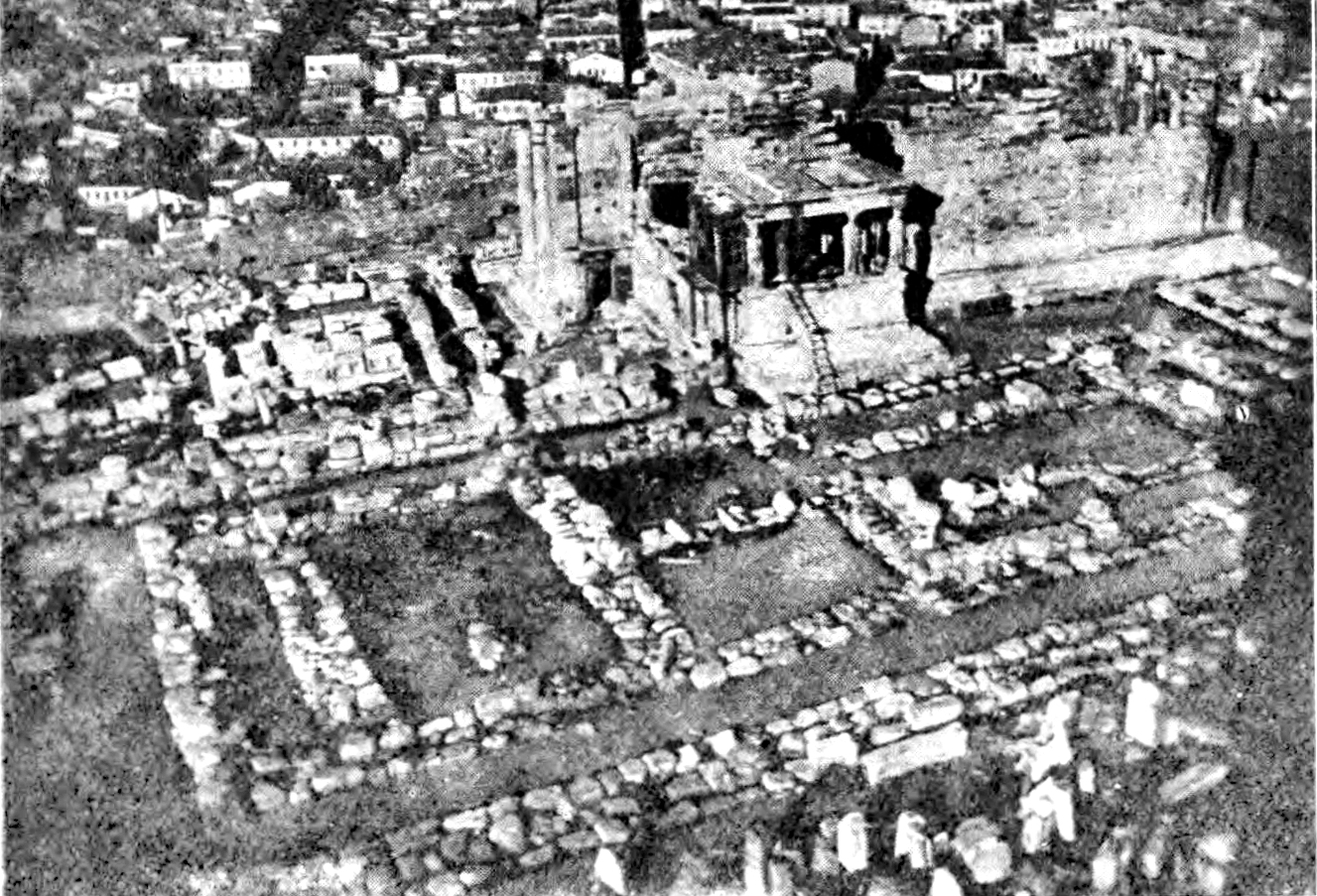
Dörpfeld Foundations Temple, south of the Erechtheion

Prior to the archaeological discoveries of the late 19th century, the existence of the archaic temple on the acropolis was known only from literary testimonia, and the few remains from the archaic buildings which have been visible continuously from antiquity to the present day—namely, the unfinished marble column drums and the poros entablature with marble metopes built into the north wall of the Acropolis overlooking the lower city. The earliest of these are Homer’s references to Athena’s temple and the “strong house of Erechtheus”. Both Herodotus and Thucydides in recounting the attempted coup of Kylon make reference to a shrine of Athena Polias on the Acropolis. These are nonspecific but we are to understand that there existed then at least one statue of the goddess and an altar, within a sanctuary. Herodotus further mentions a hieron and adyton, and his description of the Persian siege refers to a megaron and a naos. These scant and vague descriptions of the Acropolis were, along with some archaic epigraphy, the sum of knowledge of the pre-classical citadel up to the late nineteenth century.

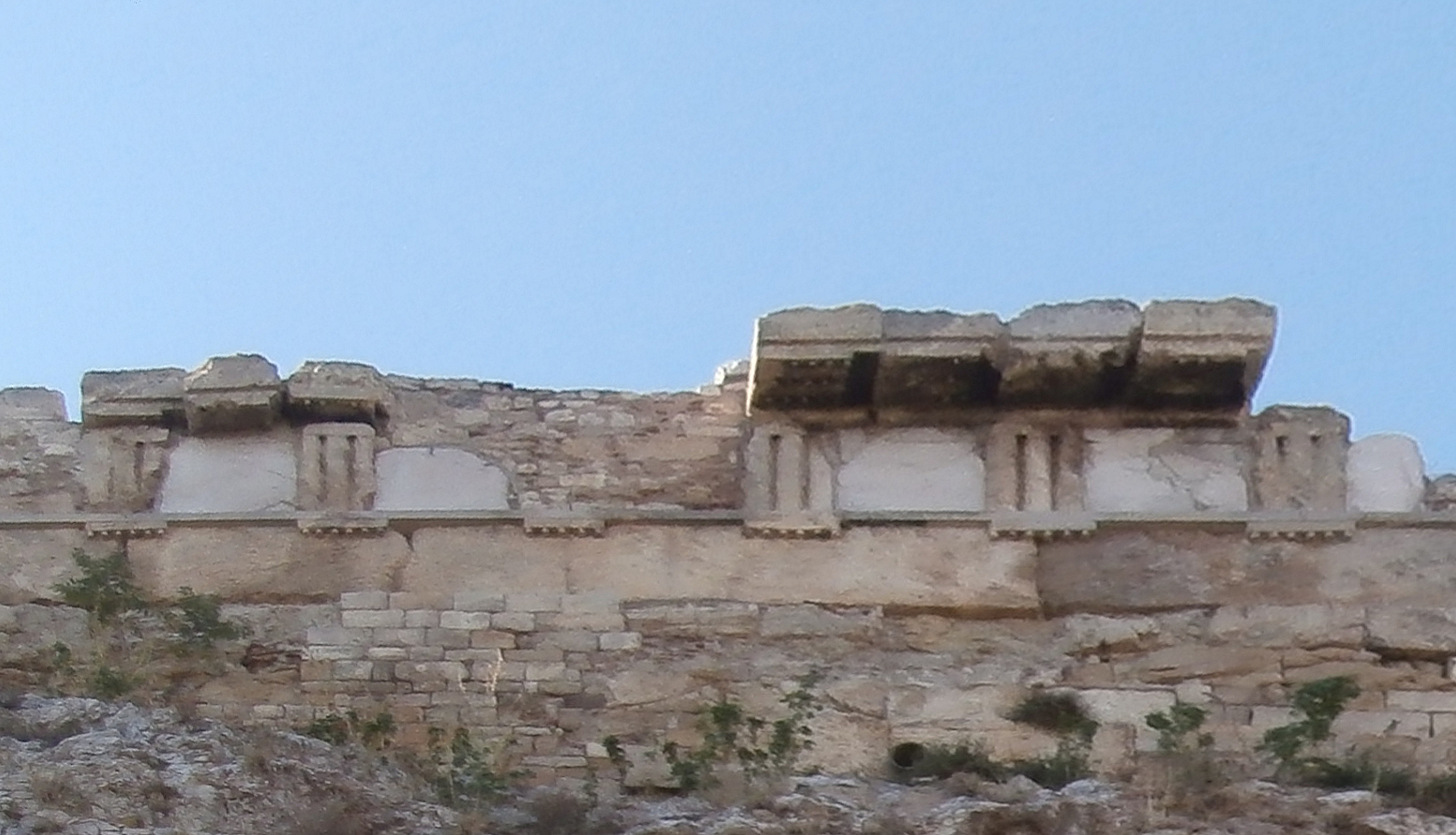
Entablature of the Old Temple of Athena built into the northern wall of the Acropolis by Themistocles, circa 478 BC

Full-scale excavations on the acropolis were opened in 1885. In the first year of excavation the foundations south of the Erechtheion were laid bare. Wilhelm Dörpfeld recognized the remains as foundations of a peripteral temple. Excavation of the inside of the north wall of the Acropolis then revealed a series of poros column drums and capitals. These were in addition to the pieces of the entablature of the archaic temple of Athena Polias which were built high up into the north wall of the Acropolis, not randomly but in correspondence with the location of the temple. Dörpfeld perceived that all this material belonged to the structure whose foundations were newly exposed. There were several striking features to this temple: there is room on the foundations for only two steps below the peristyle instead of the canonical three, a very shallow pronaos, a short eastern cella with two rows of interior columns, a tripartite division in the western portion of the building and very shallow opisthodomos. It was noted early that while there is considerable material that has plausibly been assigned to the peristyle, roof, and pediments of the building, not one fragment has been attributed with certainty to the cella building. Moreover, there is a definite difference between the foundations to the cella and the peristyle; the inner foundations are of blue acropolis limestone, and the outer courses are larger, in a pinkish "kara" limestone from Mt Hymettos and are partially worked over with a claw chisel. The claw marks are of particular significance since the introduction of the claw chisel was relatively late and prompted speculation that the inner and outer foundations had different dates. By the time he published his conclusions in 1887 Dorpfeld was of the opinion that the Archaios Neos had been restored at some time in antiquity and had, rather than been swept away in the 5th century, existed down to the time of Pausanias.

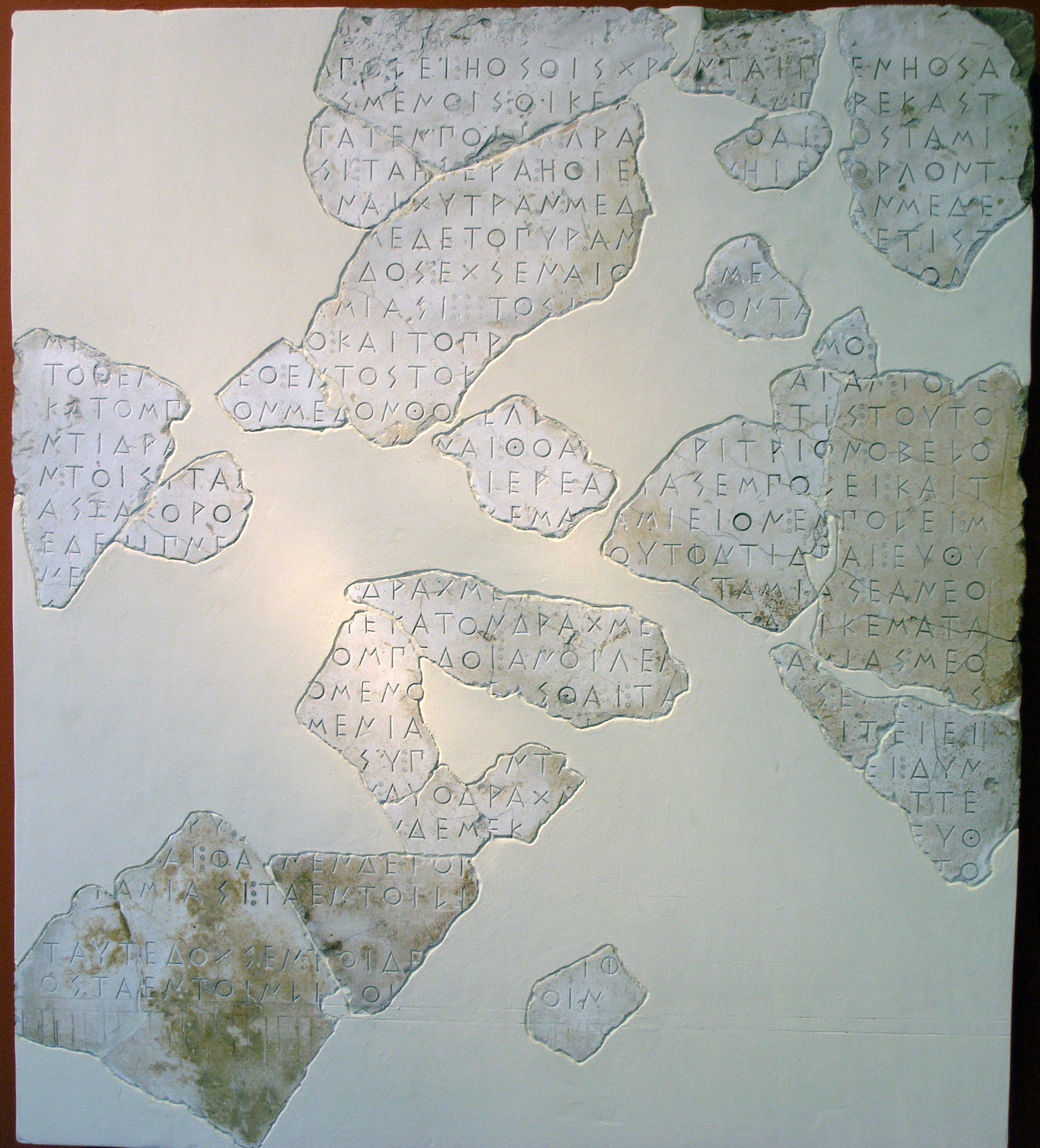
Hekatompedon decree, Metope B, Epigraphical Museum, Athens, EM 6794

Subsequent excavation of the terrace south of the Parthenon exposed the so-called "poros layer" of archaic debris including fragments of the Hekatompedon decree. This inscription, cut into two slabs of what were metopes from a sixth-century temple and datable to 485 BCE is, along with the passages in Homer, the only contemporary description of the archaic acropolis. Of particular topographical interest are lines 8-11 and 17-19: [the worshippers are prohibited from some activity (the four-letter verb is missing)] "between the temple and the great altar to the east, and outside the temple within the Kekropion, and all along the Hekatompedon."; further down, the Hekatompedon is mentioned again: "the treasurers are to open the oikemata in the Hekatompedon to be viewed not less than three times per month." This distinction between neos, altar, hekatompedon and oikemata was construed by Dorpfeld to mean that the cella of the temple was the hekatompedon and the oikemata were the three rooms in the western half of the building otherwise identified as the opisthodomos in the Kallias decrees of the 430s. This was the dominant view for a number of years until W.H Schuchhardt published the incised and painted marble sima find from the Parthenon terrace backfill in 1936. He showed that there was too much sima to fit on any temple that sat on the inner part of the Dorpfeld foundations. Dinsmoor later argued that the Schuchhardt fragments, that constituted a distinct building from the neos called the H-Architecture, allowed for a different reading of the Hekatompedon decree; that the hekatompedon, neos and oikemata were all different buildings, that the H-Architecture and Hekatompedon were one and the same and that this was the Ur-Parthenon on the foundations of the present classical building.

== Location ==
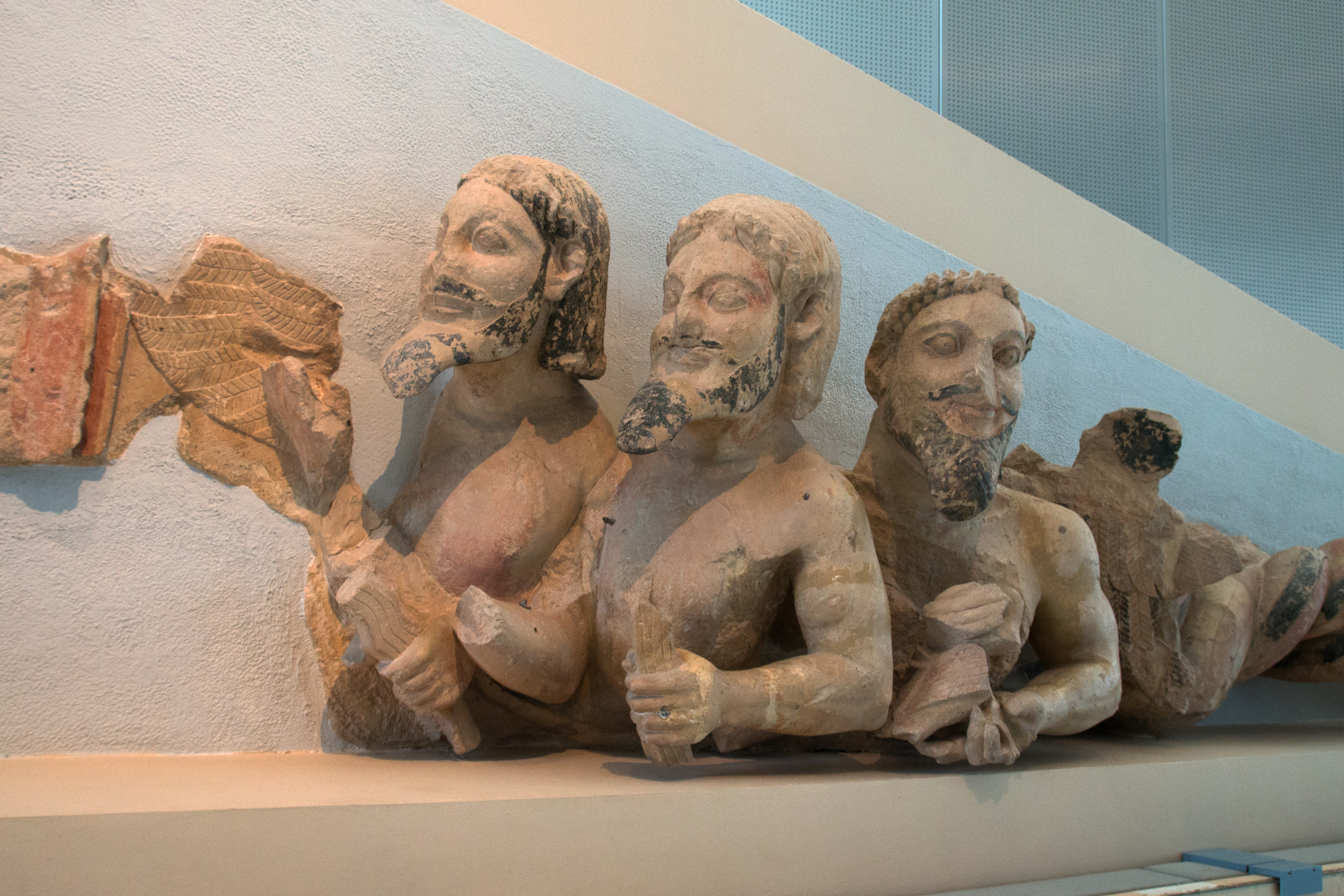
Bluebeard pediment, Acropolis Museum, Akr. 35

There are two distinct theories of the location of the Temple of the Polias. The first is that a modest seventh century temple (perhaps the second temple on the site, this is conjectured from the two column bases found within the Dörpfeld foundation) stood on the north side of the Acropolis only until the second quarter of the sixth century, when a new larger temple – the so-called Bluebeard Temple – replaced it on or near the site of the Dörpfeld foundations, the third temple of Athena Polias on the Acropolis. This, then, would have been the only significant temple on the plateau at the time and its cult statue the only one to the goddess. The south side of the Acropolis, the site of the later Parthenon, was throughout the sixth century an open terrace that was by some measurement one hundred feet long (hence the name), though this space could have been occupied by a number of small buildings or shrines. The Bluebeard Temple would have been dismantled in the last quarter of the sixth century and replaced with the Archaios Neos, the fourth Temple of Athena Polias, and the spare material from the previous temple would then be employed by the inscriber of the Hekatompedon decree.

The second theory is that the modest seventh century shrine to Athena Polias was in use down to the last quarter of the sixth century, when it was replaced by the Archaios Neos on the newly laid Dorpfeld foundations. The Archaios Neos would then have been the third temple of Athena Polias. By the second quarter of the 6th century this would have been accompanied by the grand Bluebeard Temple on the south Acropolis site. This second temple was dedicated not to Athena Polias but to Athena Parthenos – it was in a famous metaphor the grandfather of the Parthenon and it was in some dimension 100 feet long so the epithet "hekatompedon" was passed down from one architectural generation to another even though the dimensions of the later structures on the same spot no longer exactly fit the adjective. That is if the Bluebeard Temple stood on the Parthenon site it was popularly known as the Hekatompedon and it stood there until the end of the archaic period when it was dismantled in favour of another project, the Older Parthenon.

== History ==
As stated, the date of the Temple of the Polias is almost certainly the second half of the sixth century and probably the last quarter. This would make it either one of the last buildings of the Peisistratid era, or the first architectural statement of the new democracy. The date of the poros Doric temple is largely based on the style of the pediment sculptures attributed to it: these are a Gigantomachy featuring Athena and on the opposite façade two lions attacking a bull. More securely attested is the fact that it was burnt down by the Persians in the attack on Athens in 480/79 BCE. What happened subsequently is the subject of controversy. The Oath of Plataea required of the victors that they preserve their destroyed temples as a memorial, if this was indeed the case then the ruins must have stood on the Acropolis until the Periclean Building Programme (perhaps) cleared it away. Alternatively, it was Dörpfeld’s contention, recently argued by Gloria Ferrari, that the blackened shell of the Temple of the Polias remained at the centre of the Acropolis and served both as monument and treasury. Ferrari makes the analogy with the Kaiser-Wilhelm-Gedächtniskirche, where the ruins were incorporated into the fabric of a new building as relic and symbol. Ferrari cites the testimony given by the decree of the Praxiergidae of 460/50, containing the provision that a stele be set up "behind the ancient temple" implying that the ruined building continued to function as a home for the cult image before the construction of the Erechtheion. Ferrari argues, the Periclean reconstruction of the Acropolis must have made the scarred building its core and framed it with reconstructions of buildings damaged in the sack.

== Articles ==
- Beyer, I; Preisshofen, F (1977). "Die Datierung der großen Reliefgiebel des Alten Athenatempels der Akropolis". Archäologischer Anzeiger.
- Boardman, J (1972). "Herakles, Peisistratos and sons". Revue archéologique. 1: 57–72.
- Dörpfeld, Wilhelm (1886). "Der alte Athenatempel auf der Akropolis". Mitteilungen des Deutschen Archäologischen Instituts, Abteilung Athen. 11: 337–51. doi:10.11588/propylaeumdok.00001098.
- Dörpfeld, Wilhelm (1887). "Der alte Athenatempel auf der Akropolis II". Mitteilungen des Deutschen Archäologischen Instituts, Abteilung Athen. 12: 190–211.
- Dörpfeld, Wilhelm (1919). "Das Hekatompedon in Athen". Jahrbuch des Deutschen Archäologischen Instituts. 34: 1–40. doi:10.11588/diglit.44573.
- Dinsmoor, W. B. (1932). "The Burning of the Opisthodomus at Athens". American Journal of Archaeology. 36: 143–72. doi:10.2307/498656. JSTOR 498656. S2CID 245265272.
- Dinsmoor, W. B. (1947). "The Hekatompedon on the Athenian Acropolis". American Journal of Archaeology. 51 (2): 109–51. doi:10.2307/500750. JSTOR 500750. S2CID 191390455.
- Eiteljorg, H (1995). "Entrance to the Athenian Acropolis Before Mnesicles". Archaeological Institute of America Monographs. New Series. 1: 17–44.
- Ferrari, Gloria (2002). "The Ancient Temple on the Acropolis at Athens". American Journal of Archaeology. 106 (1): 11–35. doi:10.2307/507187. JSTOR 507187. S2CID 191373218.
- Kiilerich, B (1988). "The Olive-tree Pediment and the Daughters of Kekrops". Acta Ad Archaeologiam et Artium Historiam Pertinentia. 7: 1–21.
- Klein, N (1991). "A Reconsideration of the Small Poros Buildings on the Athenian Acropolis". American Journal of Archaeology. 95: 335.
- Höckmann, U (1991). "Zeus besiegt Typhon". Archäologischer Anzeiger: 11–23.
- Moore, Mary (1995). "The Central Group in the Gigantomachy of the Old Athena Temple on the Acropolis". American Journal of Archaeology. 99 (4): 633–639. doi:10.2307/506186. JSTOR 506186. S2CID 191388751.
- Paga, Jessica (2012). "The claw-tooth chisel and the Hekatompedon problem. Issues of tool and technique in Archaic Athens". Mitteilungen des Deutschen Archäologischen Instituts, Abteilung Athen. 127/128: 169–205.
- Plommer, H (1960). "The Archaic Acropolis: Some Problems". The Journal of Hellenic Studies. 80: 127–159. doi:10.2307/628383. JSTOR 628383. S2CID 164088027.
- Preisshofen, F (1977). "Zur Topographie der Akropolis". Archäologischer Anzeiger: 74–84.

== Books ==
- Bancroft, S (1979). Problems Concerning the Archaic Acropolis at Athens. PhD diss. Princeton University.
- Childs, William A. P. (1992). "The Date of the Old Temple of Athena on the Athenian Acropolis". In Coulson, William D. E. (ed.). The Archaeology of Athens and Attica under the Democracy. Oxford.
- Dinsmoor jr., W. B. (1980). The Propylaia to the Athenian Akropolis: The Predecessors. Princeton.
- Hurwit, Jeffrey M. (1999). The Athenian Acropolis: History, Mythology, and Archaeology from the Neolithic Era to the Present. Cambridge.
- Klein, N. L. (1991). The origin of the Doric order on the mainland of Greece: Form and function of the geison in the Archaic period. PhD diss. Bryn Mawr College.
- Korres, Manolis (1994). "The History of the Acropolis Monuments". In Economakis, Richard (ed.). Acropolis Restoration: the CCAM interventions. Academy Editions.
- Korres, Manolis (1997). "Die Athena-Tempel auf der Akropolis". In Hoepfner, Wolfram (ed.). Kult und Kultbauten auf der Akropolis.
- Palagia, O (1993). The Pediments of the Parthenon. Brill.
- Ridgway, B (1993). The Archaic Style in Greek Sculpture. Ares.
- Shapiro, H. A. (1989). Art and Cult Under the Tyrants in Athens. Zabern.
- Winter, N. A. (1993). Greek Architectural Terracottas: From The Prehistoric to the End of the Archaic Period. Oxford.
