= Achaemenid destruction of Athens =

Part of the second Persian invasion of Greece (480–479 BC)

- Part of the second Persian invasion of Greece
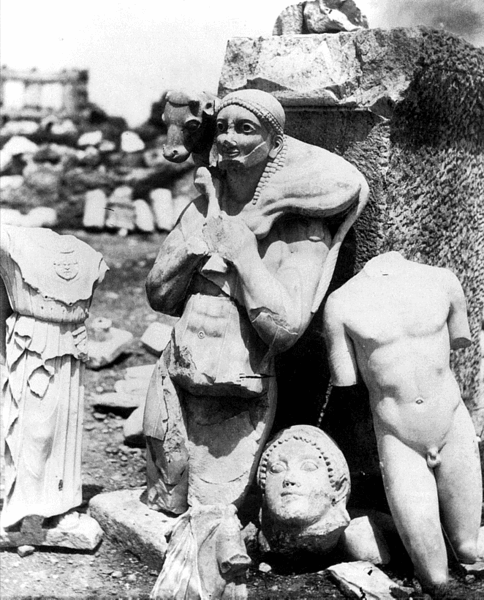
- Perserschutt, a collection of Greek artifacts that were destroyed by Persian soldiers at the Acropolis of Athens, photographed shortly after being excavated in 1866.

- Location: 37.983972°N 23.727806°E; Ancient Greece
- Victim: Citizens of Athens
- Perpetrator: Achaemenid Empire

During the second Persian invasion of Greece, which took place from 480 to 479 BCE, Athens was captured and subsequently destroyed by the Achaemenid Empire. A prominent Greek city-state, it was attacked by the Persians in a two-phase offensive, amidst which the Persian king Xerxes the Great had issued an order calling for it to be torched. The Persian army commander Mardonius oversaw the razing of several structures of political and religious significance throughout the city, including the Acropolis, the Old Temple of Athena, and the Older Parthenon. One year later, the Greek coalition retook Athens and dealt a devastating defeat to the Persian army during the Battle of Plataea, killing Mardonius and setting the stage for the eventual expulsion of all Persian troops from southern Greece.

Athens' destruction by the Persians prompted the Greeks to build the Themistoclean Wall around the city in an effort to deter future invaders, and the event continued to have an impact on Greek society for a prolonged period; a number of Athenian artifacts that had been taken to Persia during the Greco-Persian Wars were returned to Greece during the Wars of Alexander the Great, and according to the Greek historians Plutarch and Diodorus, it was the legacy of the Persian assault on Athens that ultimately influenced Alexander's decision to burn down the Palace of Persepolis near the end of his conquest of Persia in 330 BC.

== First phase: Xerxes I (480 BCE) ==
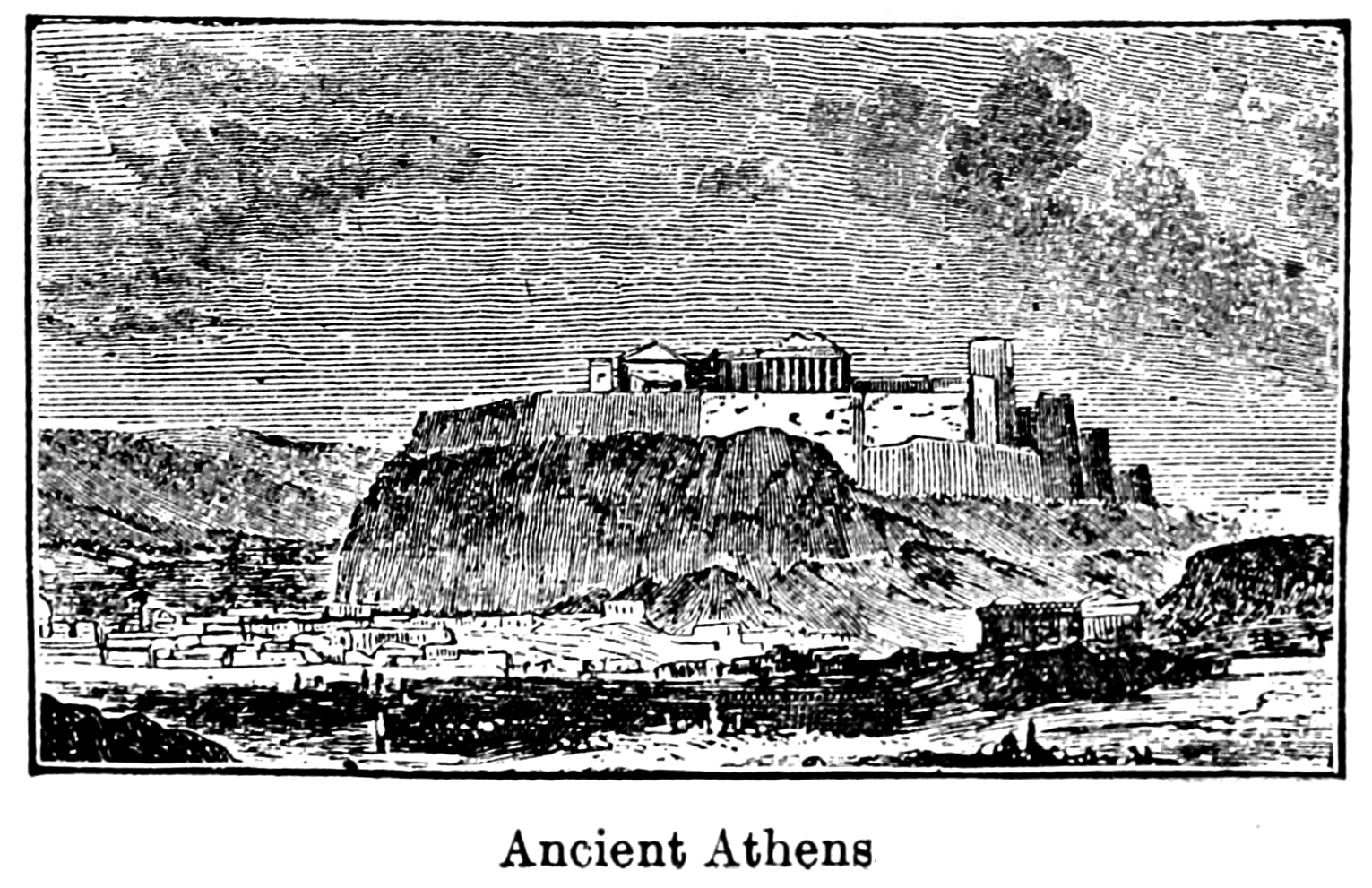
"The Citadel at Athens" at the time of Xerxes I (1900 impression by American writer Jacob Abbott)

In 480 BCE, following the Battle of Thermopylae, all of Boeotia fell to the Persian army. Thespiae and Plataea, the two Greek cities that had resisted Xerxes, were captured and subsequently razed. Attica was left open to a Persian offensive, and the remaining population of Athens was thus evacuated, with the aid of the Greek fleet, to Salamis. The Peloponnesians began to prepare a defensive line across the Isthmus of Corinth, building a wall and demolishing the road from Megara, thereby abandoning Athens to the Persians.

Athens fell a first time in September 480 BCE. The small number of Athenians who had barricaded themselves on the Acropolis were eventually defeated, and Xerxes then ordered his troops to torch the city. The Acropolis was razed, and the Old Temple of Athena and the Older Parthenon were destroyed:

Those Persians who had come up first betook themselves to the gates, which they opened, and slew the suppliants; and when they had laid all the Athenians low, they plundered the temple and burnt the whole of the acropolis.

— Herodotus VIII.53

Shortly thereafter, Xerxes lost a large part of his fleet to the Greeks during the Battle of Salamis. With the Persians' naval superiority removed from the war, Xerxes feared that the Greeks might sail to the Hellespont and destroy his pontoon bridges. According to Herodotus, Mardonius volunteered to remain in Greece and complete the campaign with a hand-picked group of troops while advising Xerxes to retreat to Asia with the bulk of the Persian army. Attica was abandoned by the Persians, with Mardonius overwintering in Boeotia and Thessaly.

Some Athenians were thus able to return to their burnt-out city for the winter, but they would again have to evacuate in the face of another Persian offensive in June 479 BCE.

== Second phase: Mardonius (479 BCE) ==
Mardonius' troops in Greece

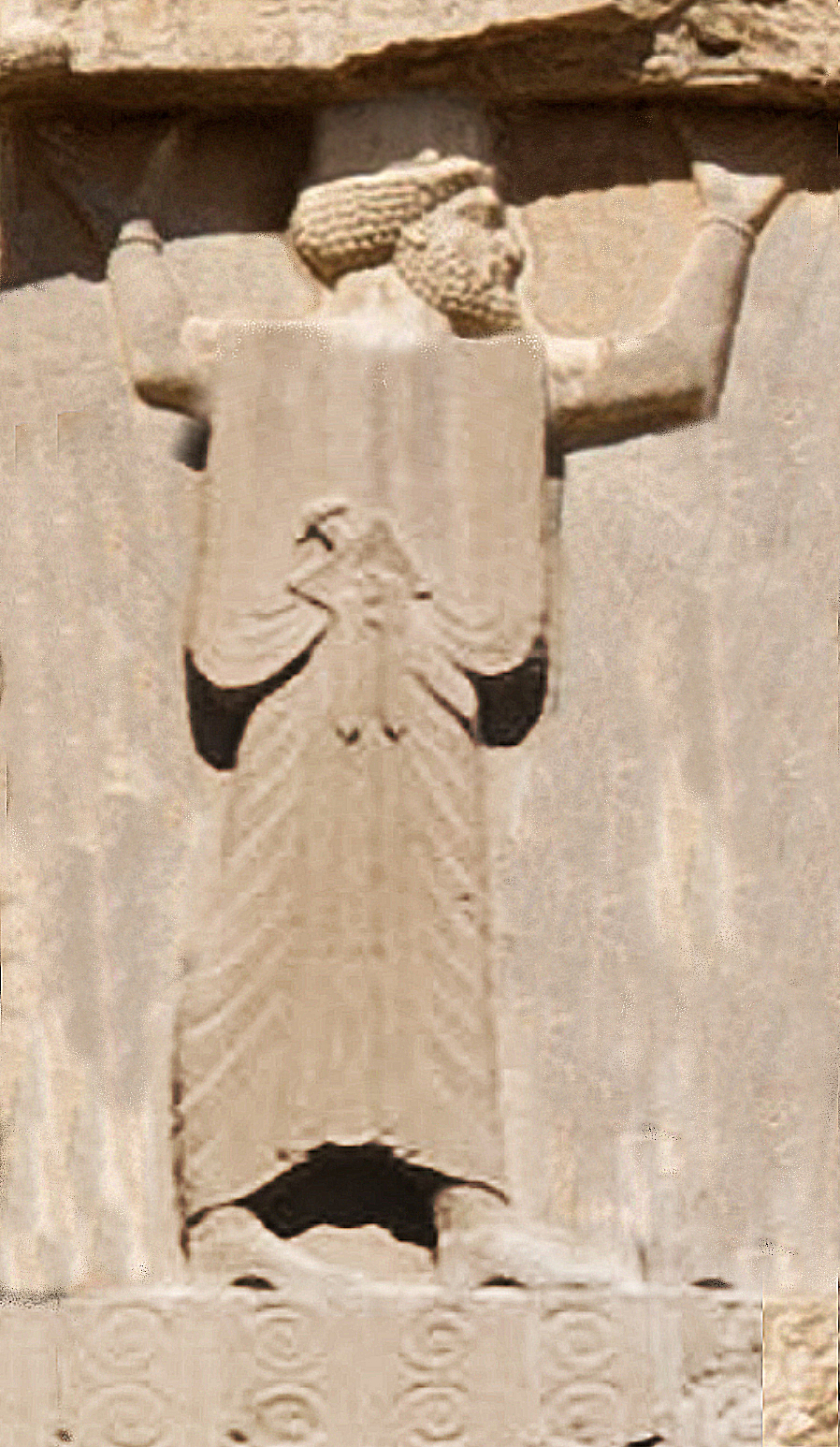
Persians

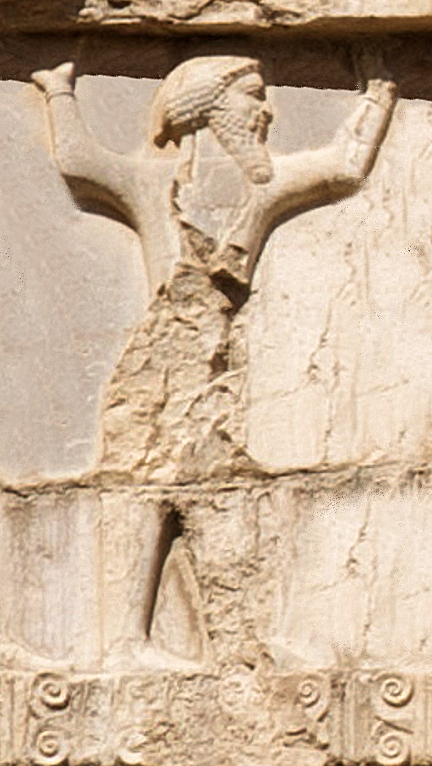
Medians

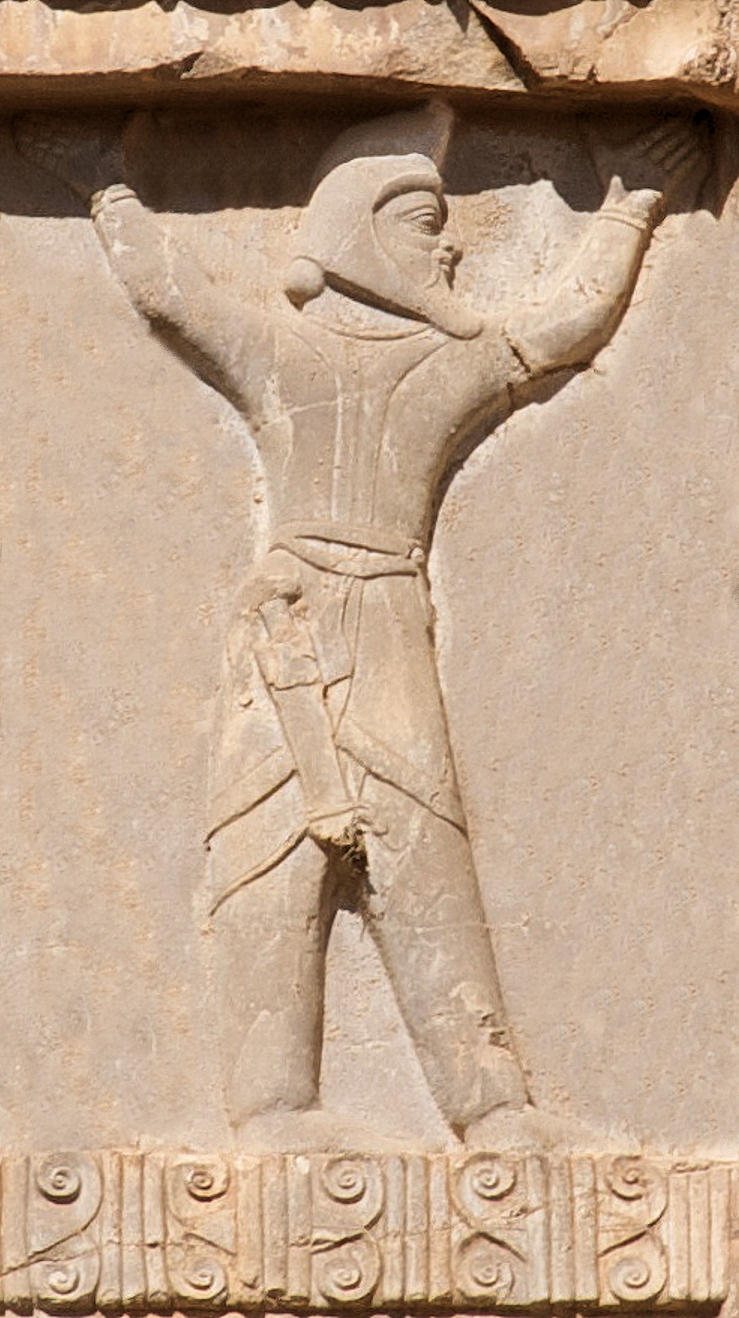
Sakas

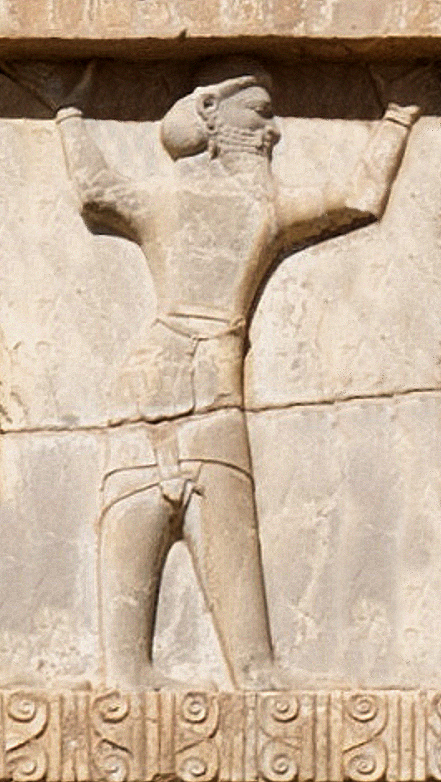
Bactrians

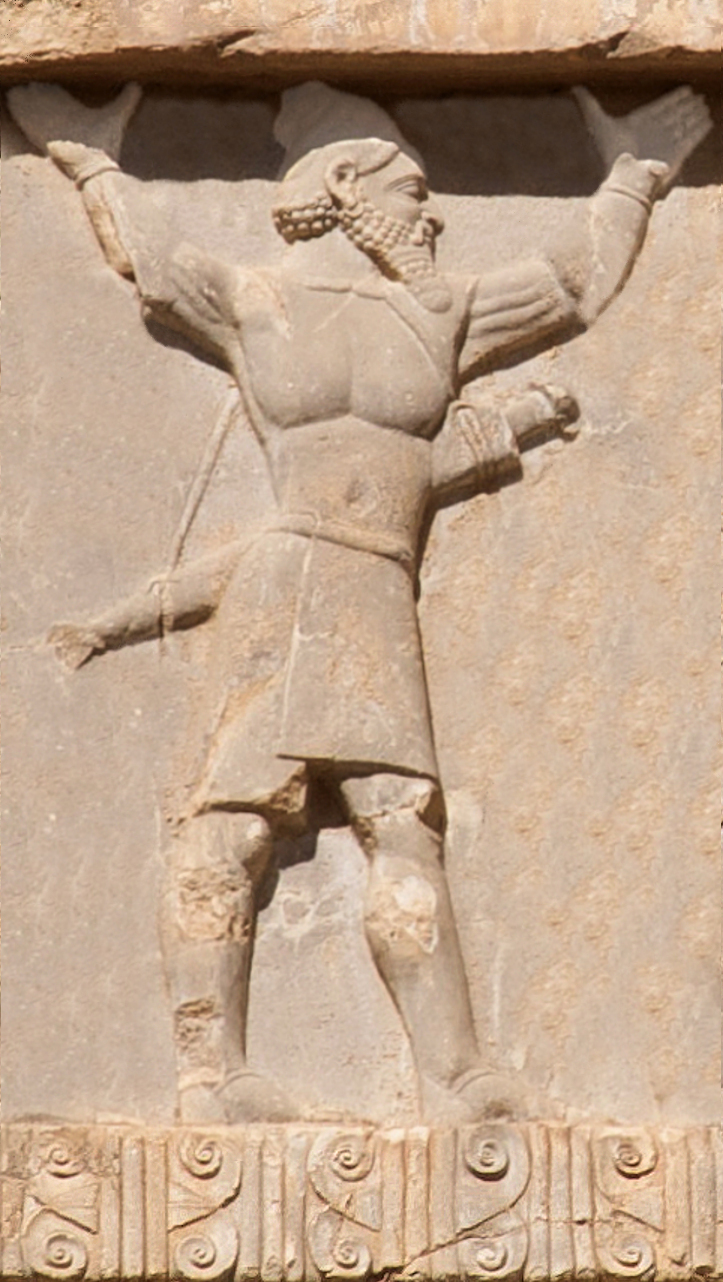
Indians

Prevalent ethnic identities among the Achaemenid soldiers commanded by Mardonius, according to Greek historian Herodotus and illustrated in the list of troops by ethnicity on the tomb of Persian king Xerxes I at Naqsh-e Rostam.

Mardonius remained with the rest of the Persian army in northern Greece. Herodotus described the composition of his special troops:

Mardonius there chose out first all the Persians called Immortals, save only Hydarnes their general, who said that he would not quit the king's person; and next, the Persian cuirassiers, and the thousand horse, and the Medes and Sacae and Bactrians and Indians, alike their footmen and the rest of the horsemen. He chose these nations entire; of the rest of his allies he picked out a few from each people, the goodliest men and those that he knew to have done some good service... Thereby the whole number, with the horsemen, grew to three hundred thousand men.

— Herodotus VIII, 113.

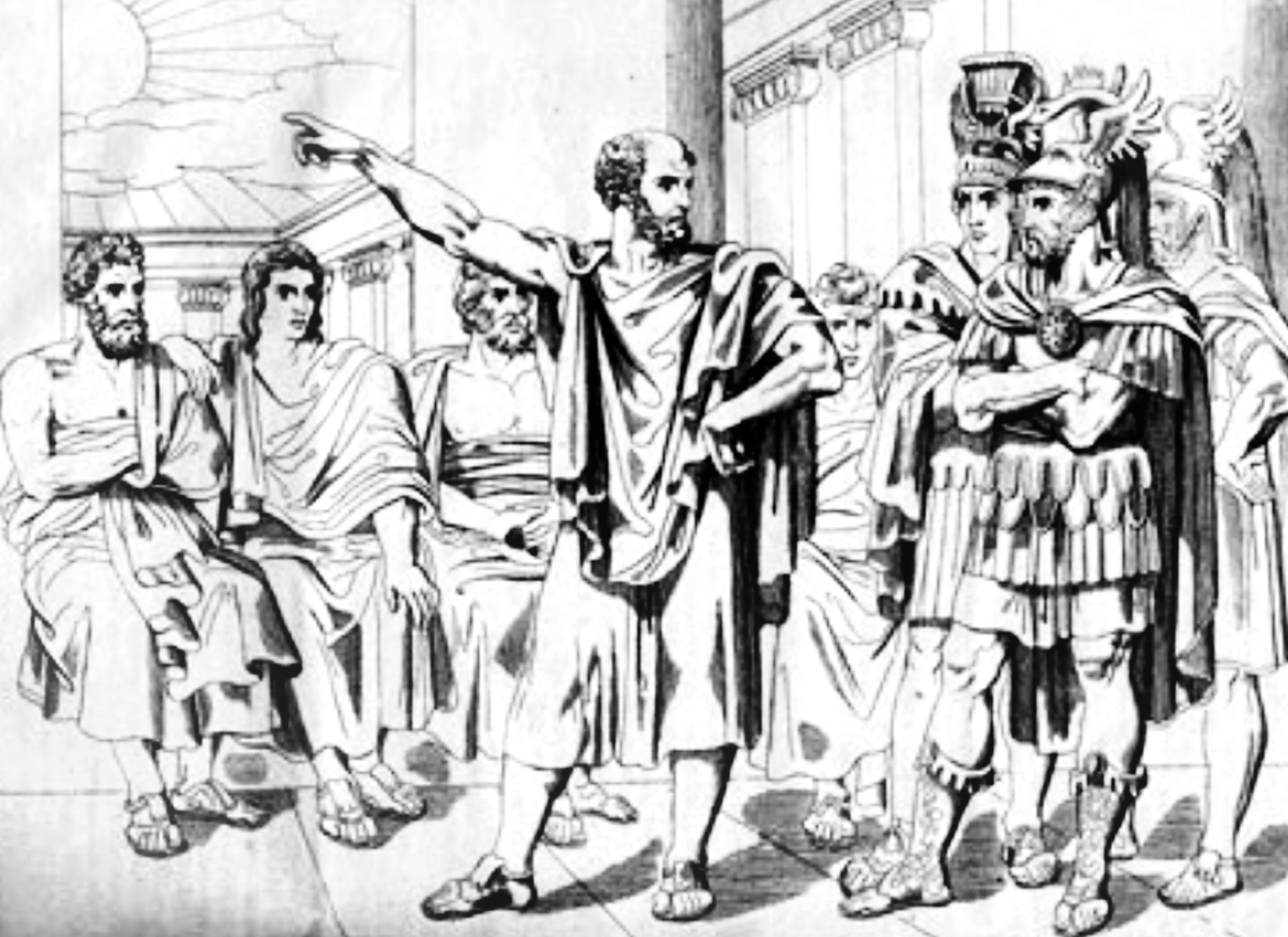
Answer of Athenian army commander Aristides to the ambassadors of Persian army commander Mardonius: "As long as the Sun holds to its present course, we shall never come to terms with Xerxes."

Mardonius remained in Thessaly, knowing an attack on the Isthmus was pointless, while the Allied Greeks refused to send an army outside of the Peloponessus. Moving to break the stalemate, Mardonius offered to the Athenians peace, self-government, and territorial expansion (with the aim of thereby removing their fleet from the Allied forces), using Alexander I of Macedon as an intermediary. The Athenians, keeping with them a delegation from Sparta on hand to hear the offer, rejected it. Thus, the Persians marched south to take possession of Athens once more, forcing the residents to evacuate.

This time, Mardonius brought even more thorough destruction to the city, and some authors considered that the city was truly razed to the ground during this second military offensive. According to Herodotus, after the negotiations broke off:

(Mardonius) burnt Athens, and utterly overthrew and demolished whatever wall or house or temple was left standing.

— Herodotus IX.13

== Recovery of the city ==
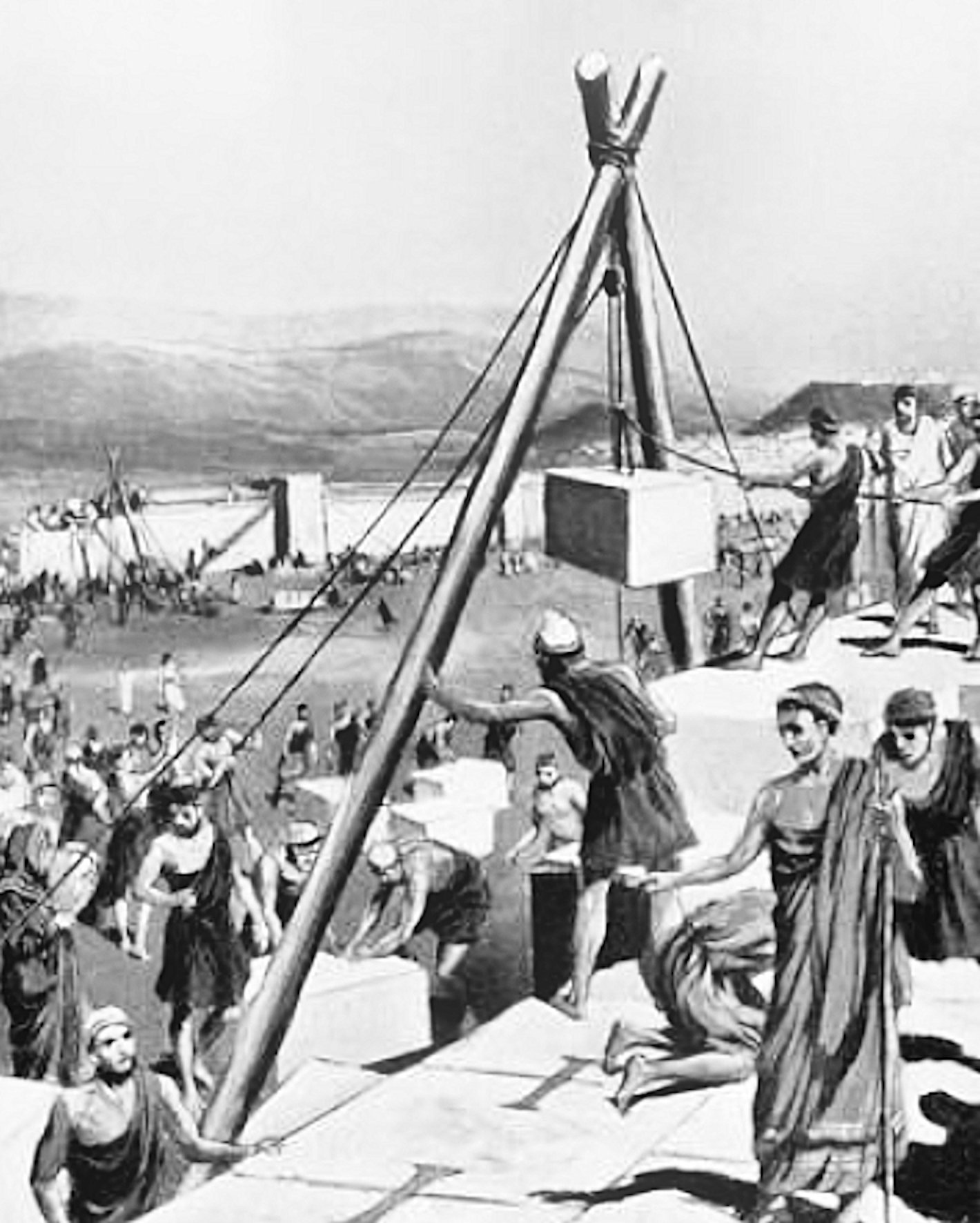
Athenians rebuilding their city under the direction of Themistocles (1914 impression in Volume I of Hutchinson's History of Nations)

The Persians were decisively beaten at the ensuing Battle of Plataea, and the Greeks were able to recover Athens. They had to rebuild everything, including a new Parthenon on the Acropolis. These efforts at reconstruction were led by Themistocles in the autumn of 479 BC, who reused remains of the Older Parthenon and Old Temple of Athena to reinforce the walls of the Acropolis, which are still visible today in the North Wall of the Acropolis. His priority was probably to repair the walls and build up the defenses of the city, before even endeavouring to rebuild temples. Themistocles in particular is considered as the builder of the northern wall of the Acropolis incorporating the debris of the destroyed temples, while Cimon is associated with the later building of the southern wall.

=== Construction of the Themistoclean Wall ===
The Themistoclean Wall, named after Themistocles, was built right after the destruction of Athens with the hope of defending against another invasion. A lot of these building efforts were accomplished using spolia.

The Parthenon was only rebuilt much later, after more than 30 years had elapsed, by Pericles, possibly because of an original vow that the Greek temples destroyed by the Persians should not be rebuilt.

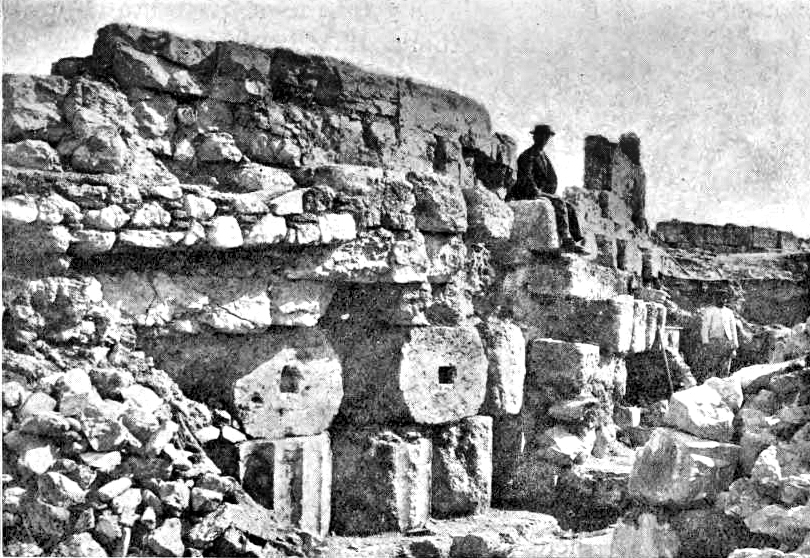
Architectural remains of the Old Athena Temple built into the north wall of the Acropolis by Themistocles

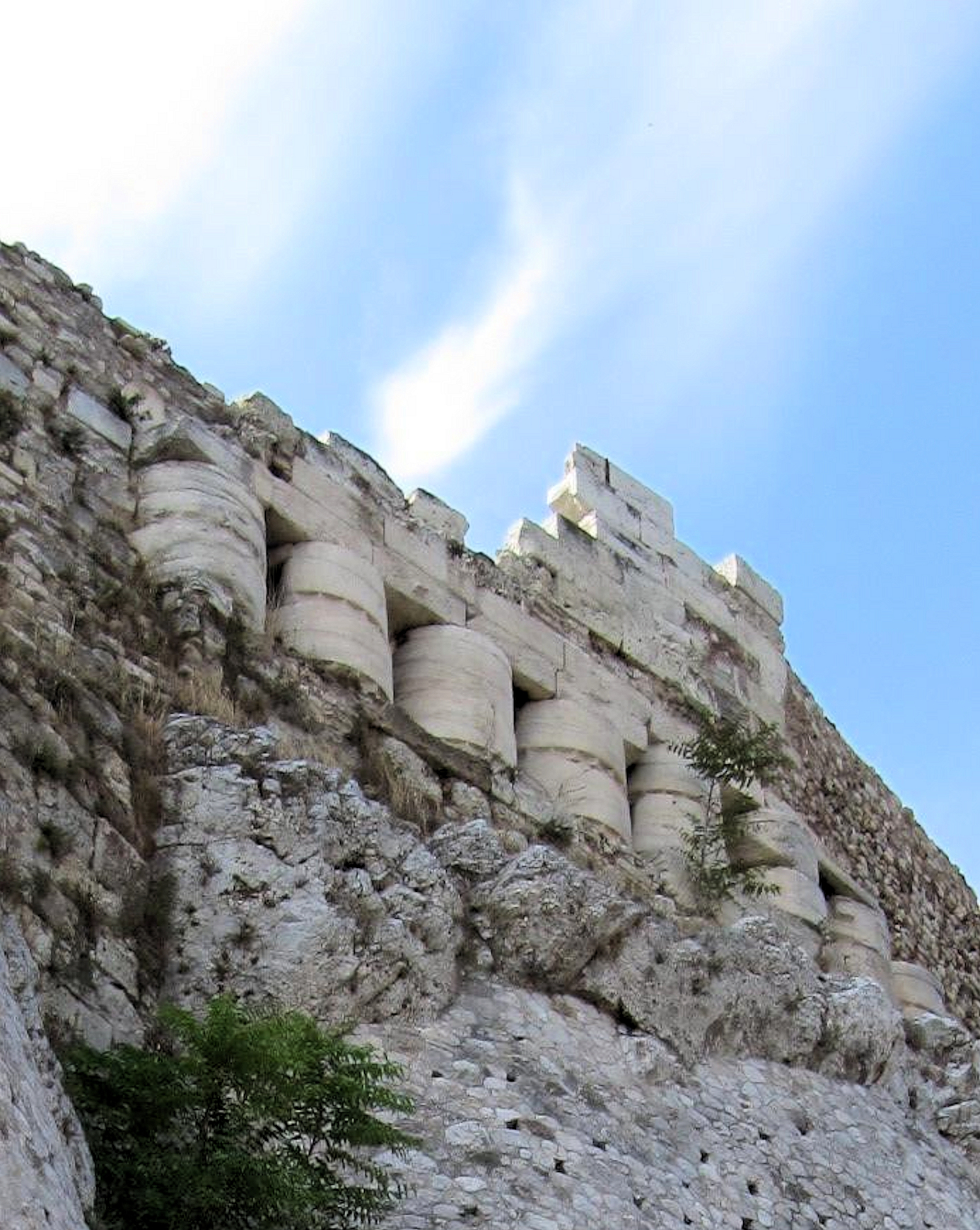
Column drums of the Older Parthenon, reused in the North wall of the Acropolis, by Themistocles

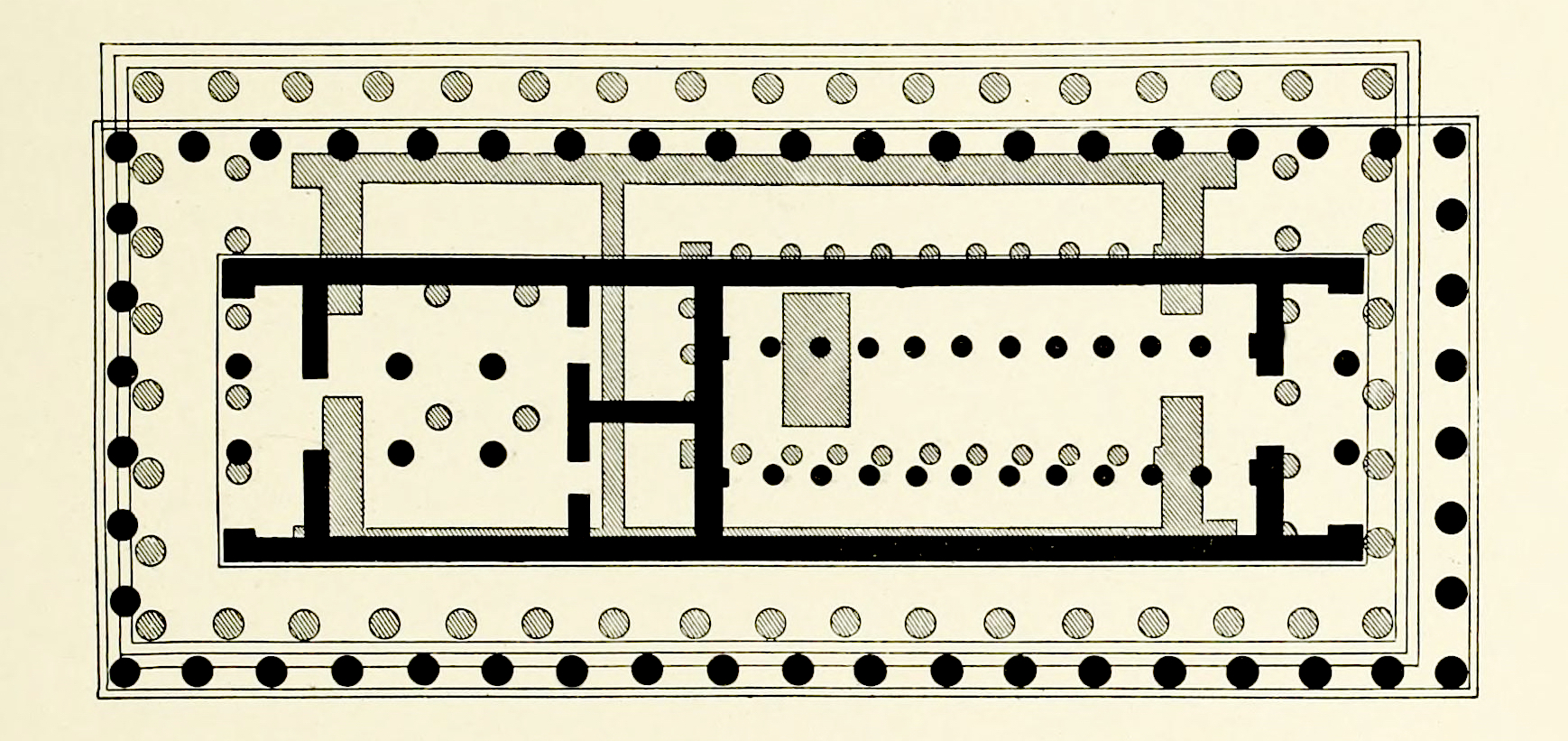
The Older Parthenon (in black) was destroyed by the Achaemenids, and then rebuilt by Pericles in 438 BCE (in grey).

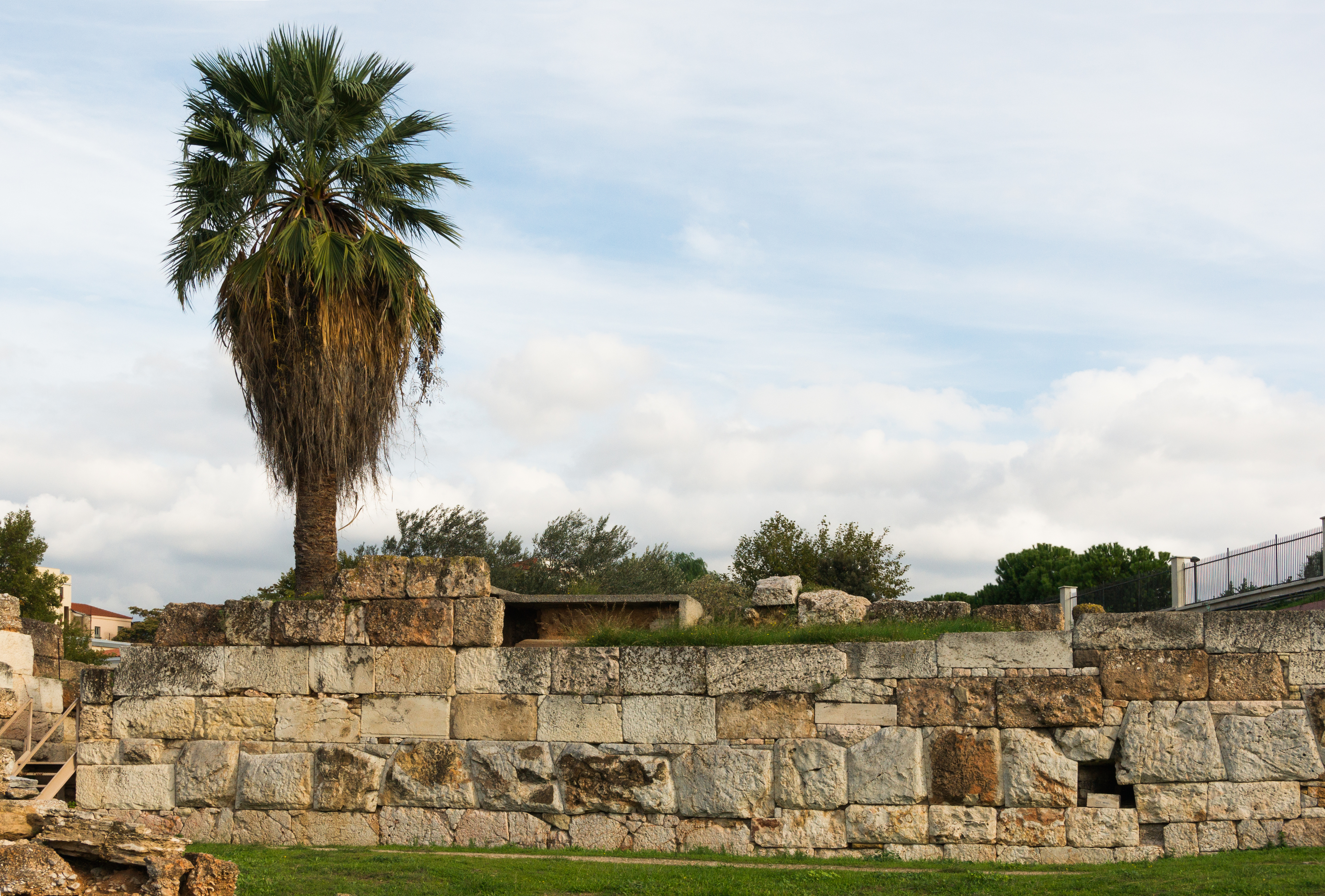
Ruins of the Themistoclean Wall

== Ramifications ==
=== Burning of the Palace of Persepolis by Alexander the Great ===
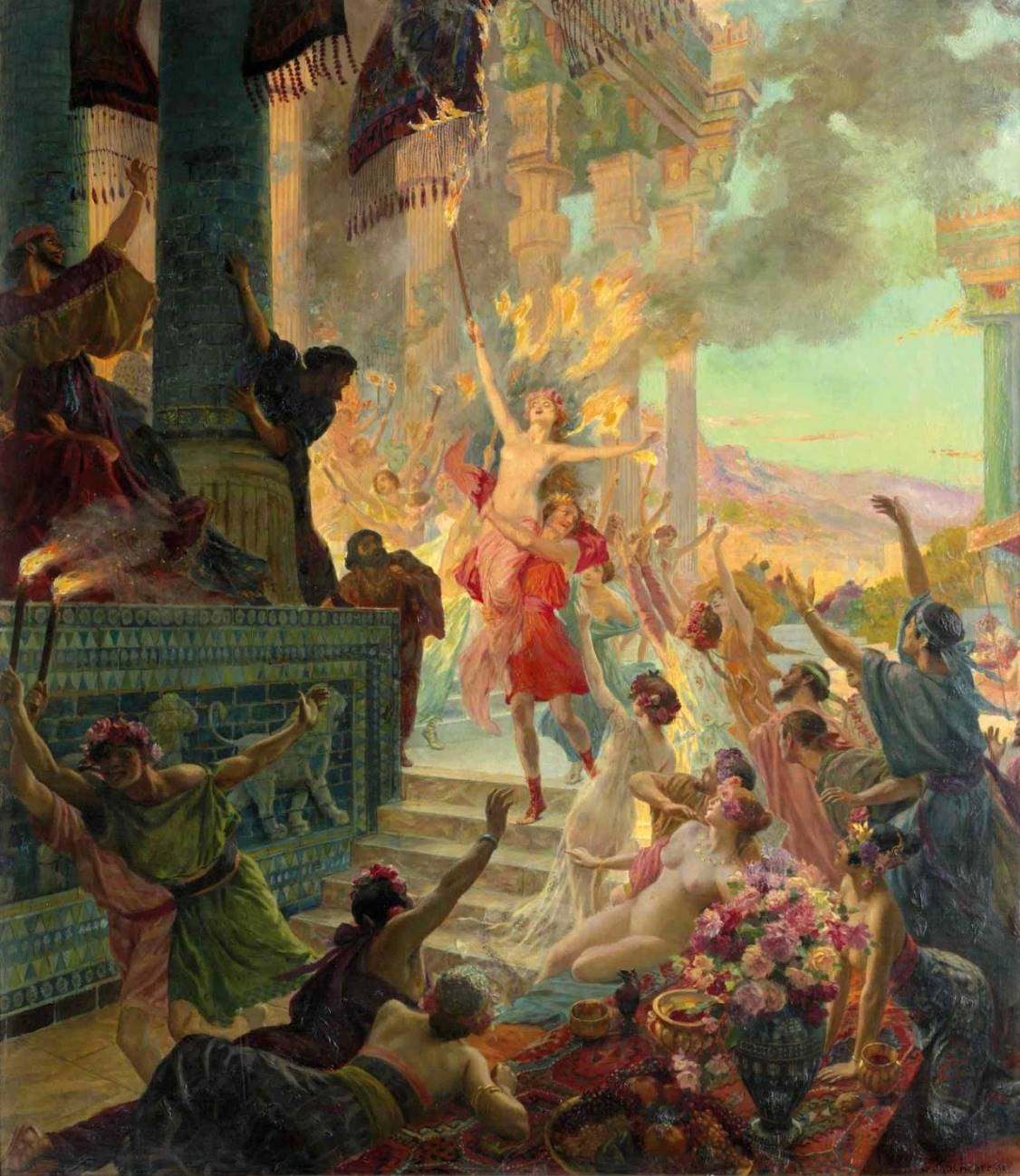
Alexander the Great lifting the torch-wielding Thaïs, who instigated the burning of the fallen Persian capital city Persepolis (1890 impression by French painter Georges Rochegrosse in L'incendie de Persepolis)

In 330 BCE, Alexander the Great burned down the Palace of Persepolis, which had served as the principal residence of the defeated Achaemenid dynasty. He made this decision after a drinking party and supposedly at the instigation of his companion Thaïs, though according to Plutarch and Diodorus, setting fire to Persepolis was intended to be retribution for the destruction of Athens during the Greco-Persian Wars.

When the king [Alexander] had caught fire at their words, all leaped up from their couches and passed the word along to form a victory procession in honour of Dionysus. Promptly many torches were gathered. Female musicians were present at the banquet, so the king led them all out for the comus to the sound of voices and flutes and pipes, Thaïs the courtesan leading the whole performance. She was the first, after the king, to hurl her blazing torch into the palace. As the others all did the same, immediately the entire palace area was consumed, so great was the conflagration. It was remarkable that the impious act of Xerxes, king of the Persians, against the acropolis at Athens should have been repaid in kind after many years by one woman, a citizen of the land which had suffered it, and in sport.

— Diodorus of Sicily (XVII.72)

== Modern archaeological excavations ==
=== Perserschutt ===
Numerous remains of statues vandalized by the Persians have been excavated and are known collectively as the Perserschutt (lit. 'Persian rubble' or 'Persian debris') following the efforts of German archaeologists Wilhelm Dörpfeld and Georg Kawerau in the 19th century.

The statue Nike of Callimachus, which was erected next to the Older Parthenon in honour of Callimachus and the Greek victory during the Battle of Marathon, was severely damaged by the Persian army. The statue depicts Nike (the personification of victory) in the form of a woman with wings on top of an inscribed column. Its height is 4.68 metres (15.4 ft) and it was made using Parian marble. The head of the statue and parts of the torso and hands were never recovered.

Xerxes also took away some of the artifacts, such as a bronze statue of Harmodius and Haristogiton, which was recovered in the city of Susa during the Wars of Alexander the Great and subsequently returned to Greece after nearly two centuries.

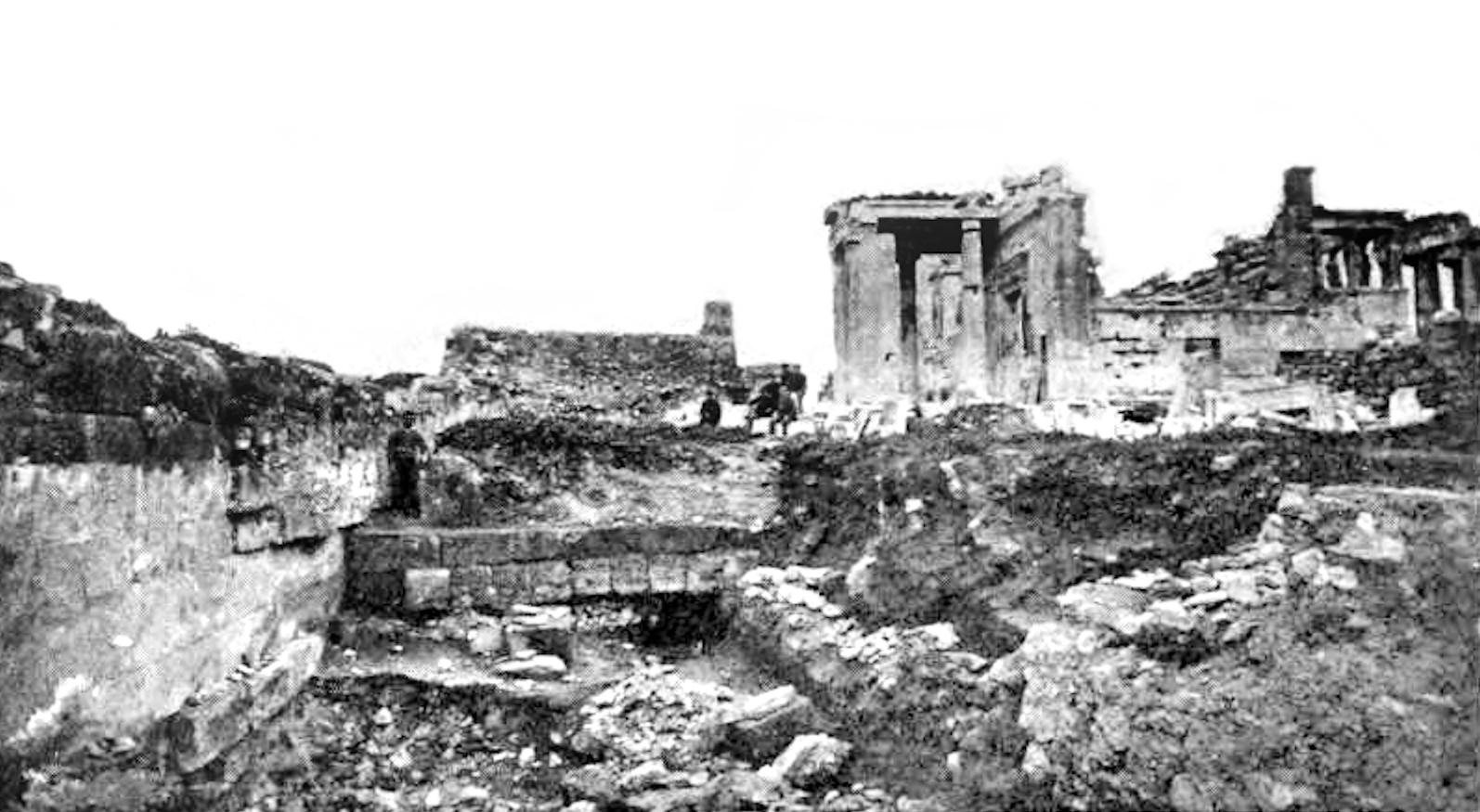
Acropolis excavation pit where remains of Archaic statues were found, northwest of the Erechtheum

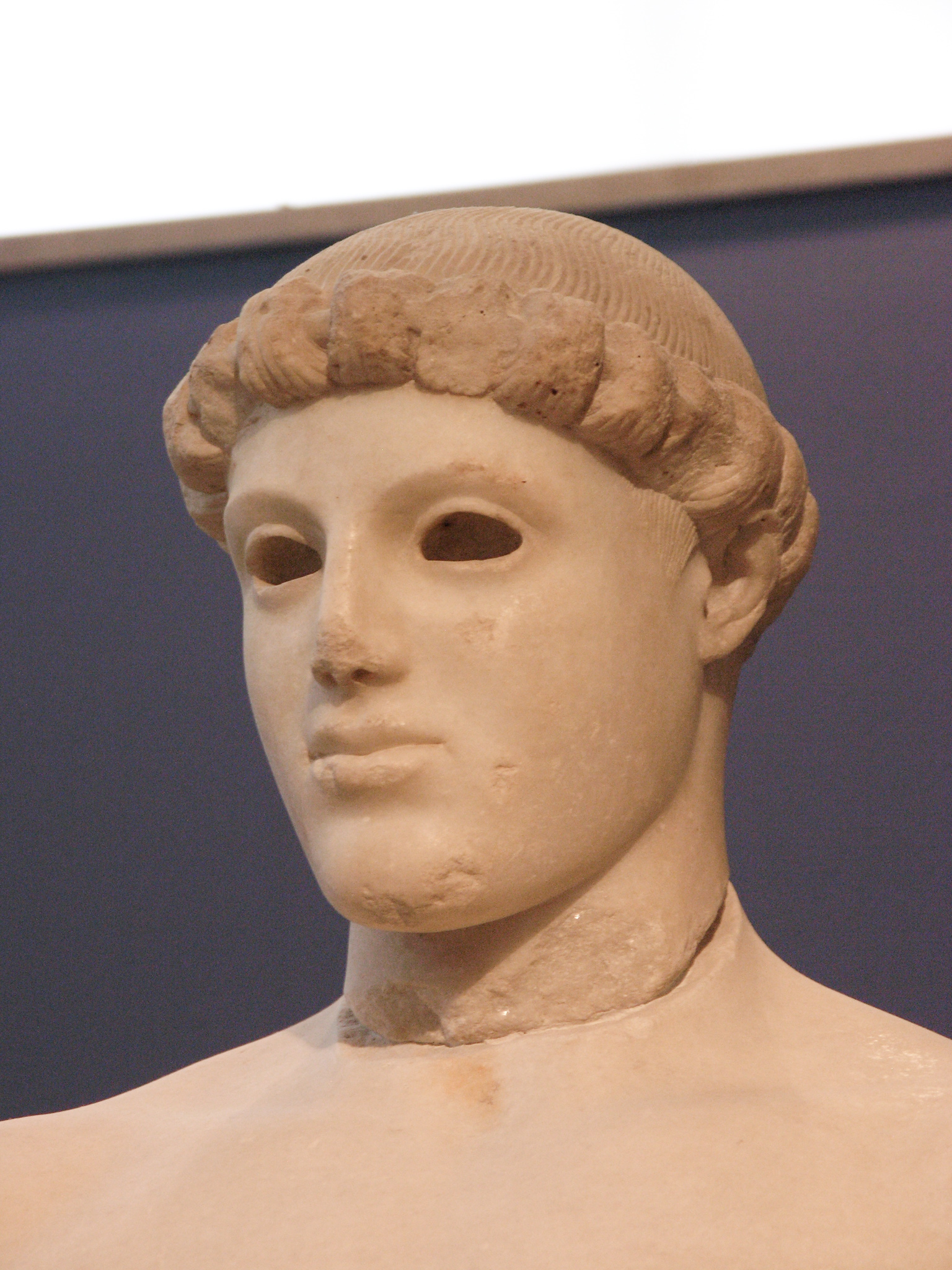
The Kritios Boy was recovered, decapitated in the Perserschutt.

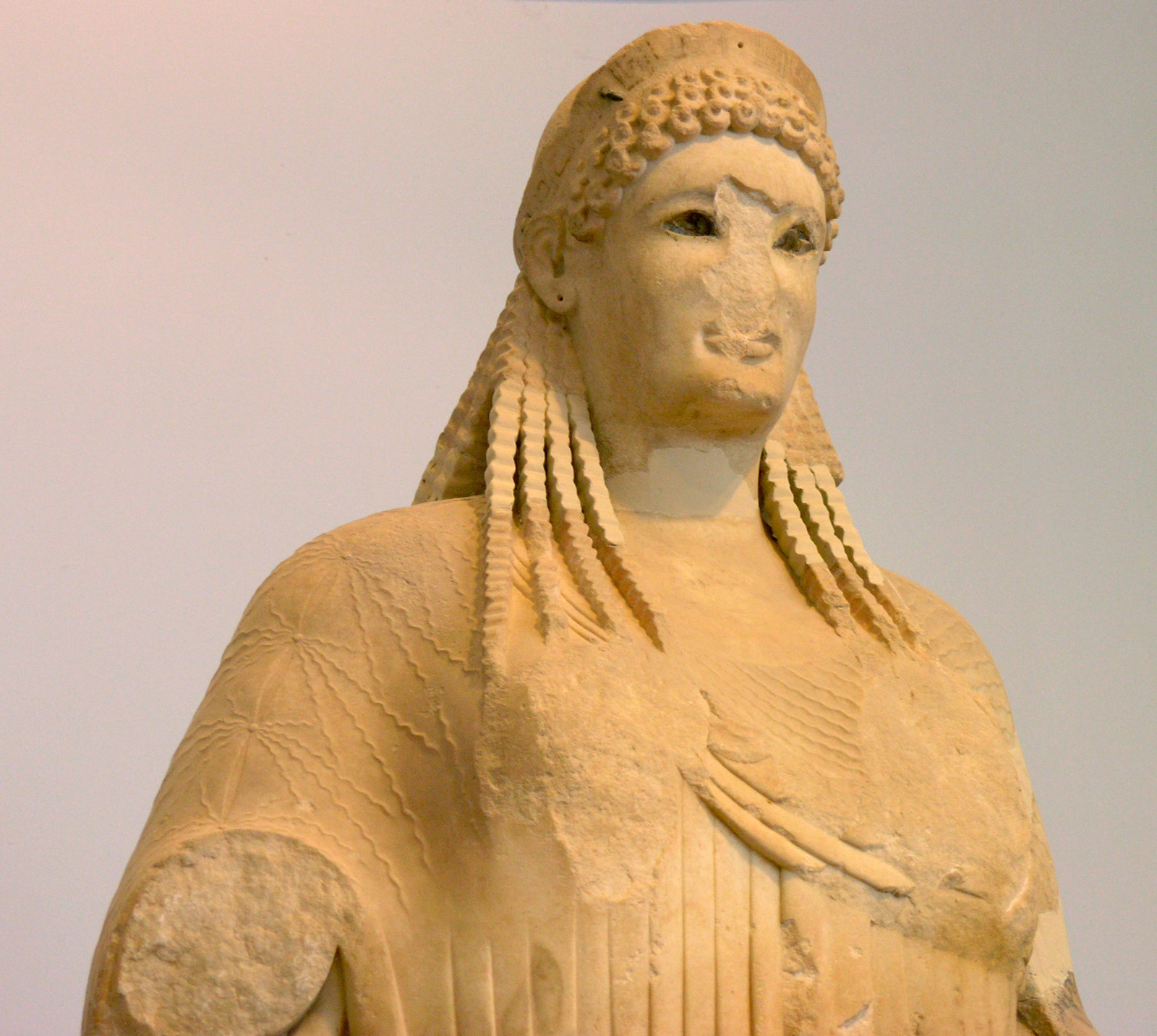
The Antenor Kore, recovered from the Perserschutt

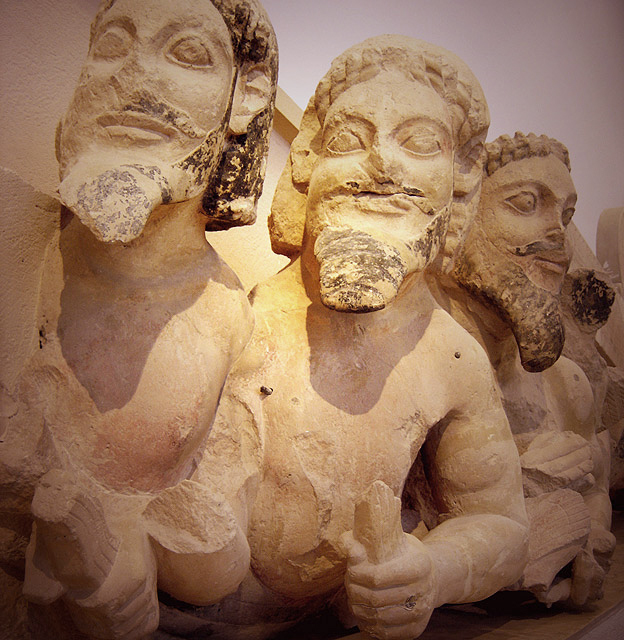
Part of the damaged Hekatompedon pediment

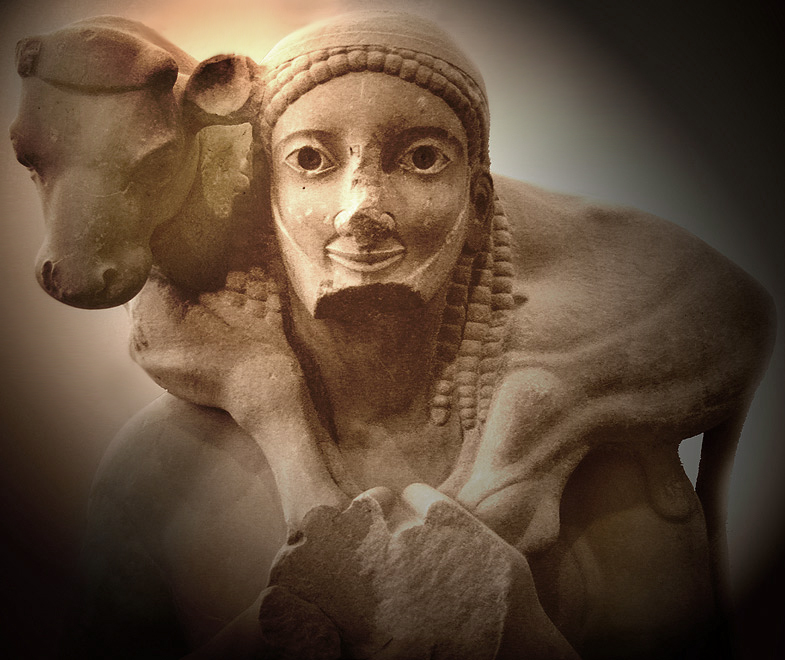
The damaged Moscophoros

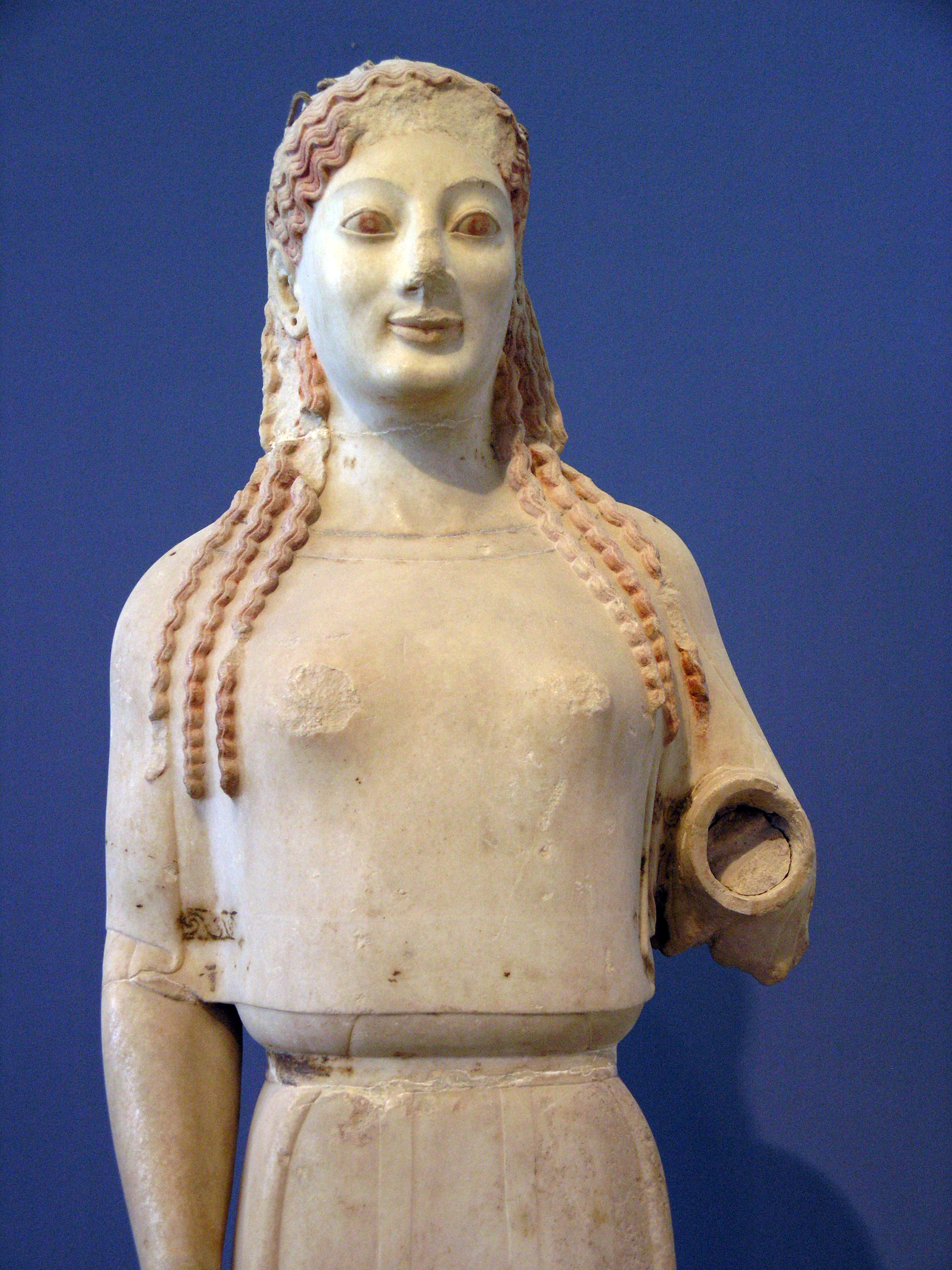
The damaged Peplos Kore

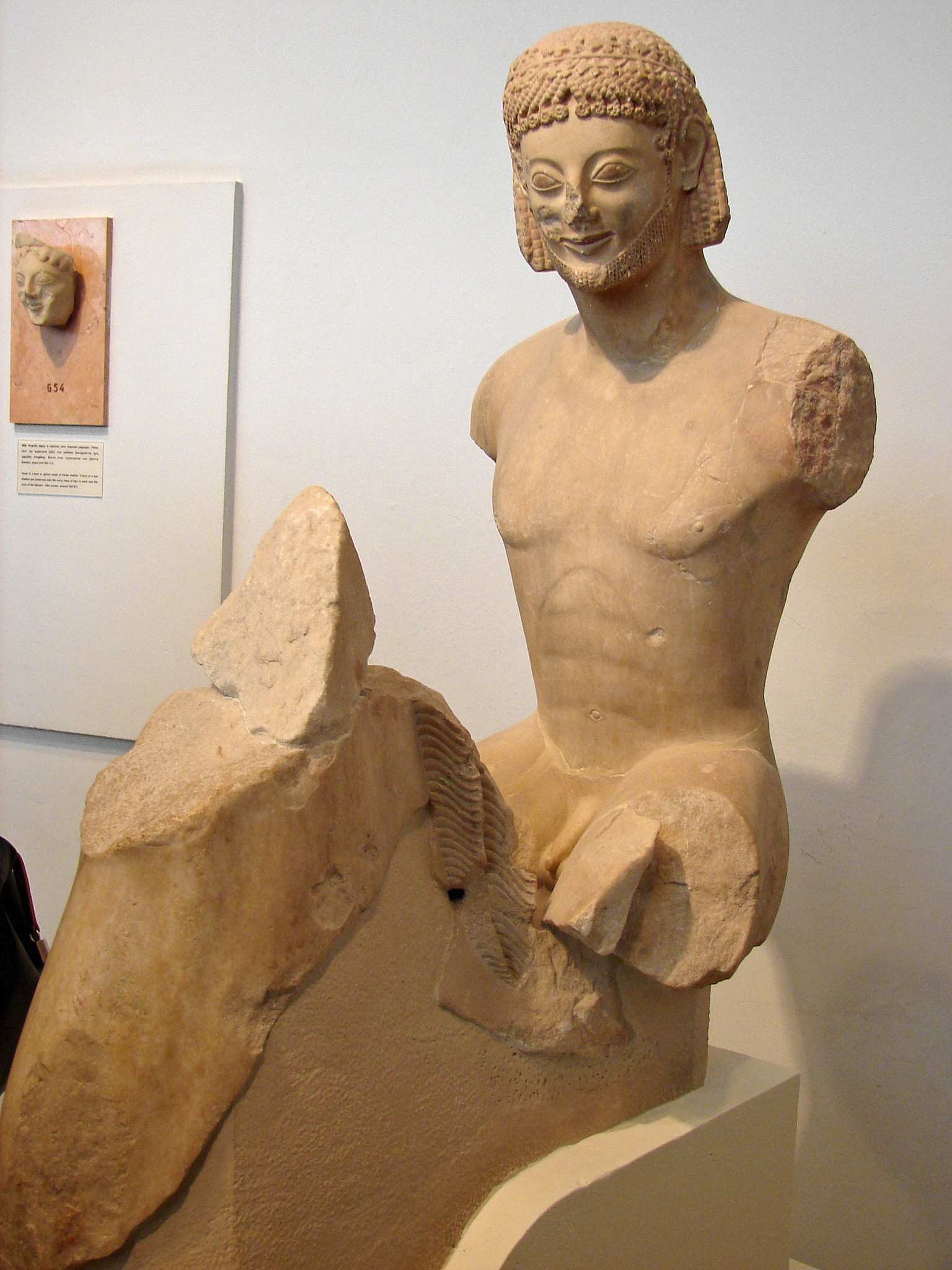
The damaged Rampin Rider

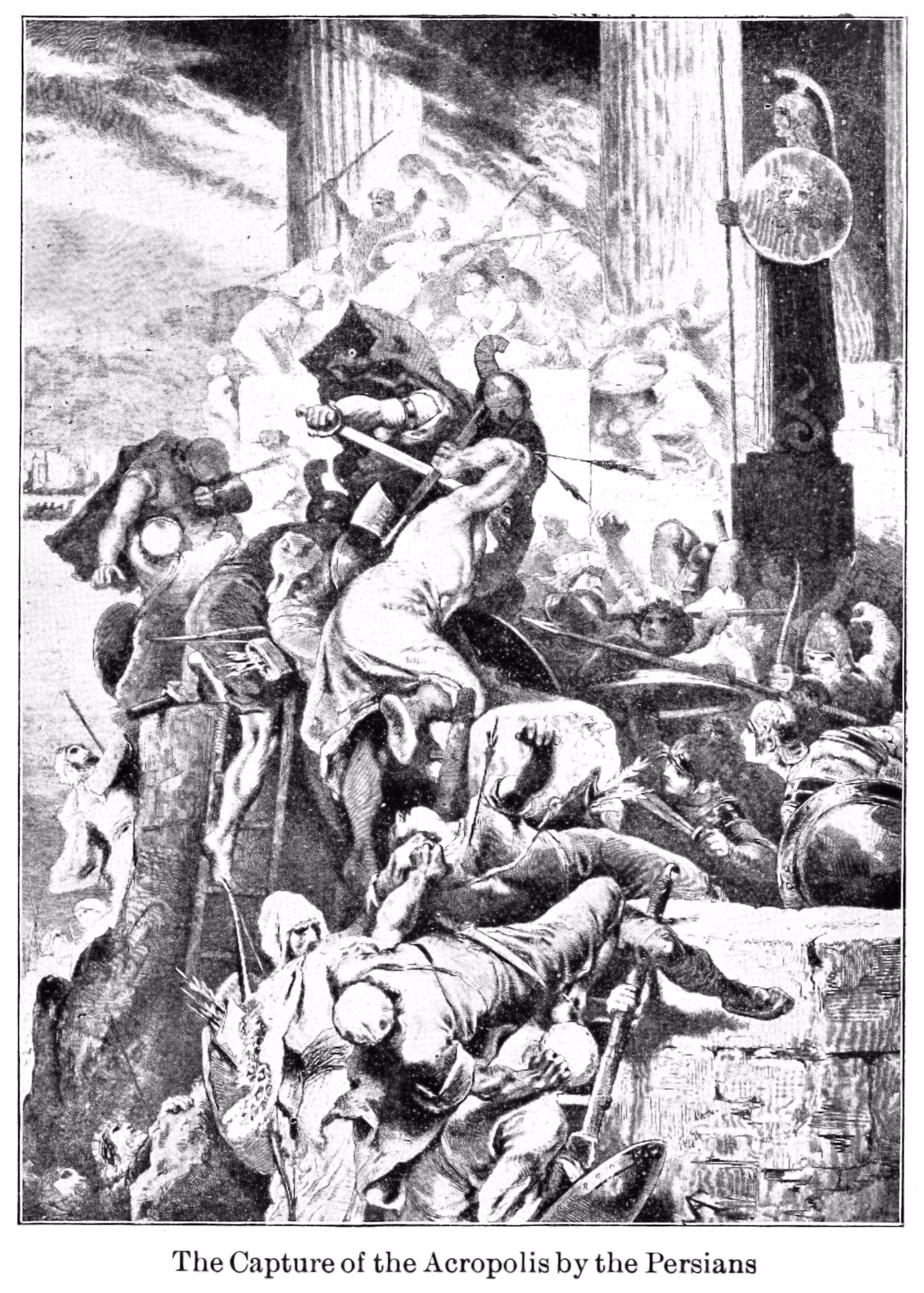
The Capture of the Acropolis by the Persians

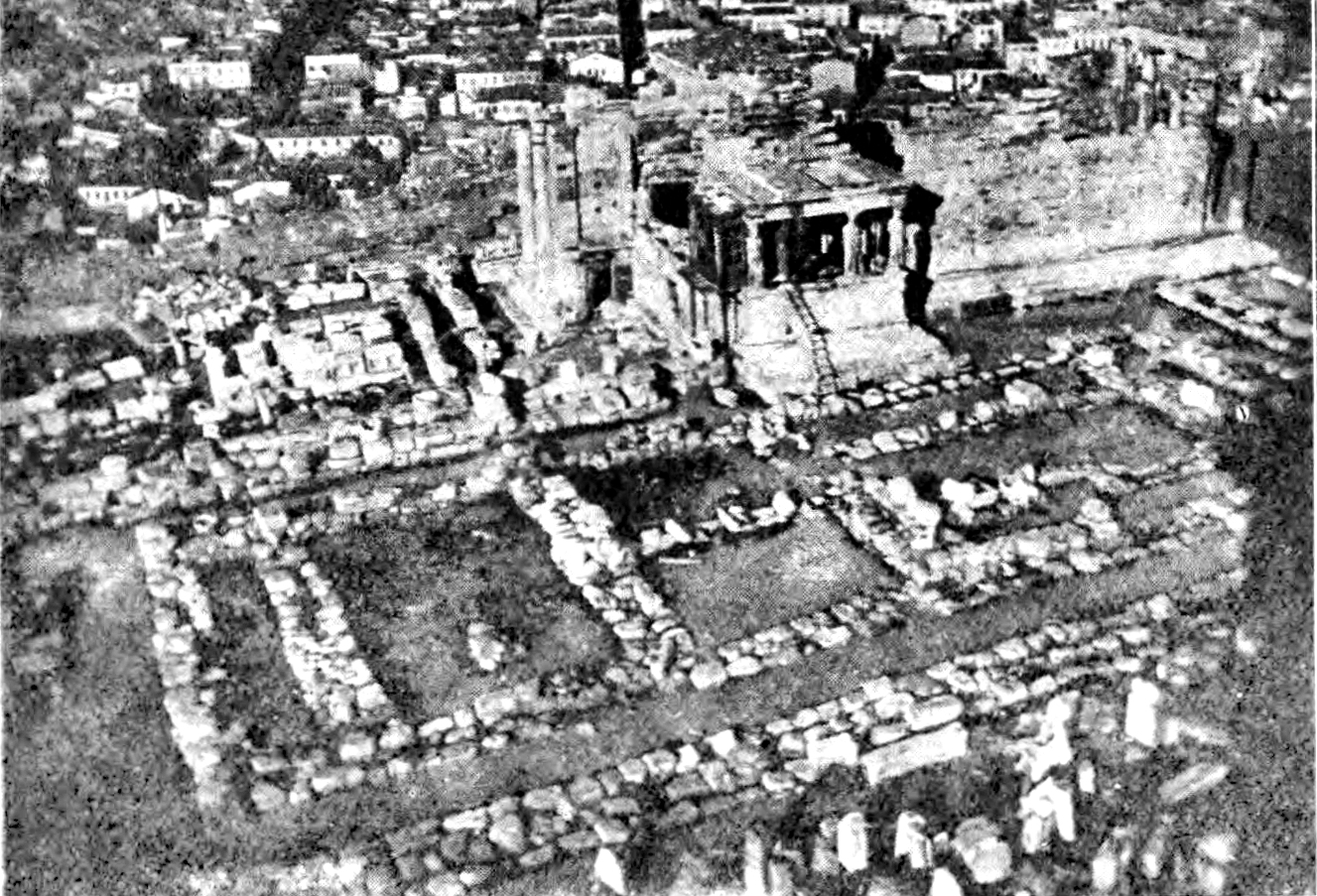
Foundations of the Old Temple of Athena, destroyed during the second Persian invasion (1909 impression in The Acropolis of Athens, by Dutch-born American scholar Martin Luther D'Ooge)

== See also ==
- Greco-Persian Wars

== Sources ==
- Holland, Tom (2006). Persian Fire: The First World Empire and the Battle for the West. Abacus, ISBN 0-385-51311-9.
