= Walter-Herwig Schuchhardt =

German classical archaeologist and art historian (1900–1976)

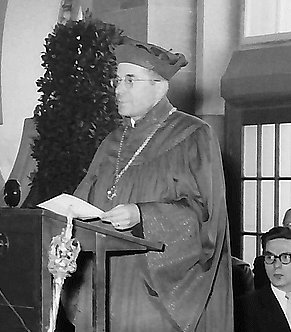
Walter-Herwig Schuchhardt as Rector of the Freiburg University in 1954

Walter-Herwig Schuchhardt (8 March 1900 – 14 January 1976) was a German classical archaeologist and art historian born in Hanover. He specialized in ancient Greek art, particularly sculpture and art from the "Parthenon era" (5th century BC). He was the son of archaeologist Carl Schuchhardt (1859-1943).

Schuchhardt studied archaeology at the Universities of Tübingen, Göttingen and Heidelberg, earning his doctorate in 1923 with a dissertation on Pergamon friezes, titled Die Meister des grossen Frieses von Pergamon.

He received his habilitation in 1929 with the thesis, Die Entstehung des Parthenonfrieses (Emergence of Parthenon friezes), and later taught classes at the University of Giessen (1934–36). From 1936 to 1968, he was a professor at the University of Freiburg. Among his better known literary works are the following:

- Die Sima des alten Athenatempels der Akropolis (The Sima of the ancient Athenian temples of the Acropolis), (1936)
- Die Kunst der Griechen (The art of the Greeks), (1940)
- Archaische Plastik auf der Akropolis (Archaic sculpture of the Acropolis), (1943)
- Die Epochen der griechischen Plastik (The epochs of Greek sculpture), (1959)
- Griechische Kunst (Greek art), (1964)
- Geschichte der griechischen Kunst (History of Greek art), (1971)
- "(Greek art) History Of Art & Architecture" English translation by S. MacCormack: (1990)
