= Sanctuary of Pandion =

Ancient sanctuary on the Acropolis of Athens

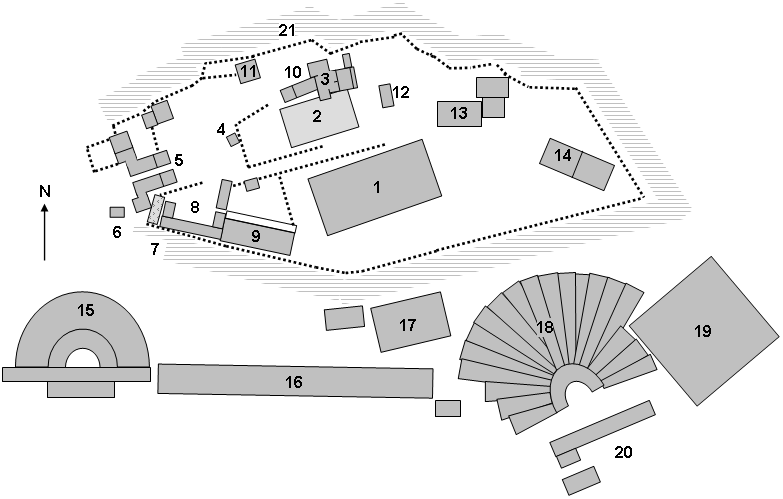
- Site plan of the Acropolis of Athens: number 14 is Building IV, generally identified as the sanctuary of Pandion

- Location of the Sanctuary of Pandion in central Athens
- 37.9714°N 23.7280°E
- Type: Hero shrine

History
- Built: Late 5th century BCE

Site notes
- Area: 40 by 70 metres (130 ft × 230 ft)
- Excavation dates: 1885–1887
- Archaeologists: Panagiotis Kavvadias; Georg Kawerau

The Sanctuary of Pandion was an ancient Greek sanctuary on the Acropolis of Athens. It is known from ancient inscriptions and from the writings of the traveller Pausanias to have been located on the eastern side of the Acropolis, and to have contained a statue of the hero Pandion, to whom it was dedicated. In modern times, it has usually been identified with the remains of a building (Building IV) located in the south-east corner of the Acropolis of Athens, whose foundations were found during excavations in the late nineteenth century.

== The sanctuary ==
In antiquity, the Sanctuary of Pandion was the heroon (hero shrine) of Pandion, the eponymous hero of the Attic tribe Pandionis. This is known from the work of the second-century CE traveller Pausanias to have been located on the eastern side of the Acropolis of Athens; Pausanias records visiting it and seeing a statue of Pandion there. It is usually assumed that the Pandion heroised in Athens was the same person as one of the two legendary kings of Athens, either Pandion I or Pandion II). Several ancient inscriptions found in Athens mention the existence of the shrine and its statue on the Acropolis.

The sanctuary was possibly the headquarters of the Panhellenion, a league of Greek cities under Roman rule established by the Roman emperor Hadrian in 131–132 CE.

== Location and excavation ==
The Sanctuary of Pandion is usually identified with a building in the southeast corner of the Acropolis. This building was excavated in a campaign begun in 1885 by Panagiotis Kavvadias, the Ephor General of Antiquities in charge of the Greek Archaeological Service, in collaboration with the German architect Georg Kawerau. Between 1887 and 1888, Kawerau constructed a museum, nicknamed the 'little one' (μικρό; mikro), (Note: In contrast to the main Acropolis Museum.) in the area of the building. It was initially identified as a workshop. During the excavations, several works of sculpture were found in the Perserschutt (the rubble of destroyed sculptures created after the Persian destruction of Athens in 480 BCE) in its foundations: these included the Moschophoros ('calf-bearer') and a head of the goddess Athena originally on the pediment of an archaic template.

The building, designated Building IV, was built on top of an early classical structure known as Building V, which was torn down to allow for its construction. Building IV was constructed in the late fifth century, on ground previously levelled as part of the construction of the Acropolis's circuit wall. It was rectangular, approximately 40 by 70 metres (130 by 230 ft) in area, open to the air and divided into two nearly equal parts by a wall. It faced west-northwest and was entered through a projecting portico on the western side. The latest possible date for the circuit wall is the 430s BCE, meaning that Building IV may have been built as part of the extensive construction plan of Pericles on the Acropolis.

In 1946, the American archaeologist Gorham P. Stevens suggested that the northern of Building IV's two areas, designated Area A, became the Acropolis's sanctuary of Pandion after the Persian destruction of the city, while Area B was used as a service area to store building materials and tools. This identification has generally been followed by subsequent scholars, though there is little direct evidence for it: Noel Robertson suggests that the Sanctuary of Pandion was further to the northwest, near the Sanctuary of Zeus Polieus, while Building IV was the sanctuary of Erechtheus.

== Bibliography ==
- Hurwit, Jeffrey M. (1999). The Athenian Acropolis: History, Mythology, and Archaeology from the Neolithic Era to the Present. Cambridge: Cambridge University Press. ISBN 0-521-42834-3.
- Jones, Nicholas F (1999). The Associations of Classical Athens: The Response to Democracy. Oxford University Press. ISBN 0-19-512175-9.
- Koulakiotis, Elias (2019). "Arrian the Priest: Provincial Cultural Identity and Roman Imperial Policy". In Dunn, Charlotte; Koulakiotis, Elias (eds.). Political Religions in the Greco-Roman World: Discourses, Practices and Images. Newcastle-upon-Tyne: Cambridge Scholars Publishing. pp. 87–107. ISBN 978-1-5275-3241-0.
- Mallouchou-Tufano, Fani (2007). "The Vicissitudes of the Athenian Acropolis in the Nineteenth Century: From Castle to Monument". In Valavanis, Panos (ed.). Great Moments in Greek Archaeology. Athens: Kapon Press. pp. 36–57. ISBN 978-0-89236-910-2.
- Robertson, Noel (1996). "Athena's Shrines and Festivals". In Neils, Jenifer (ed.). Worshipping Athena: Panathenaia and Parthenon. Madison: University of Wisconsin Press. pp. 27–77. ISBN 0-299-15114-X.
- Paschalidis, Constantinos (2020). "Finds that are Intriguing: A Group of Mycenaean Vases and Minor Finds from the Acropolis: Debating the Question of their Provenance and Significance". In Papadimitriou, Nikolas; Wright, James C.; Fachard, Sylvian; Polychronakou-Sgouritsa, Naya; Andrikou, Eleni (eds.). Athens and Attica in Prehistory: Proceedings of the International Conference, Athens, 27–31 May 2015. Oxford: Archaeopress. pp. 529–540. ISBN 978-1-78969-672-1.
- Petrakos, Vasileios (2007). "The Stages of Greek Archaeology". In Valavanis, Panos (ed.). Great Moments in Greek Archaeology. Athens: Kapon Press. pp. 16–35. ISBN 978-0-89236-910-2.
- Stevens, Gorham P. (1946). "Northeast Corner of the Parthenon" (PDF). Hesperia. 15: 1–26. doi:10.2307/146816. JSTOR 146816.
