= Erechtheion =

Ancient Greek temple

Coordinates: 37.9721°N 23.7265°E

Erechtheum
- Ἐρέχθειον (in Greek)
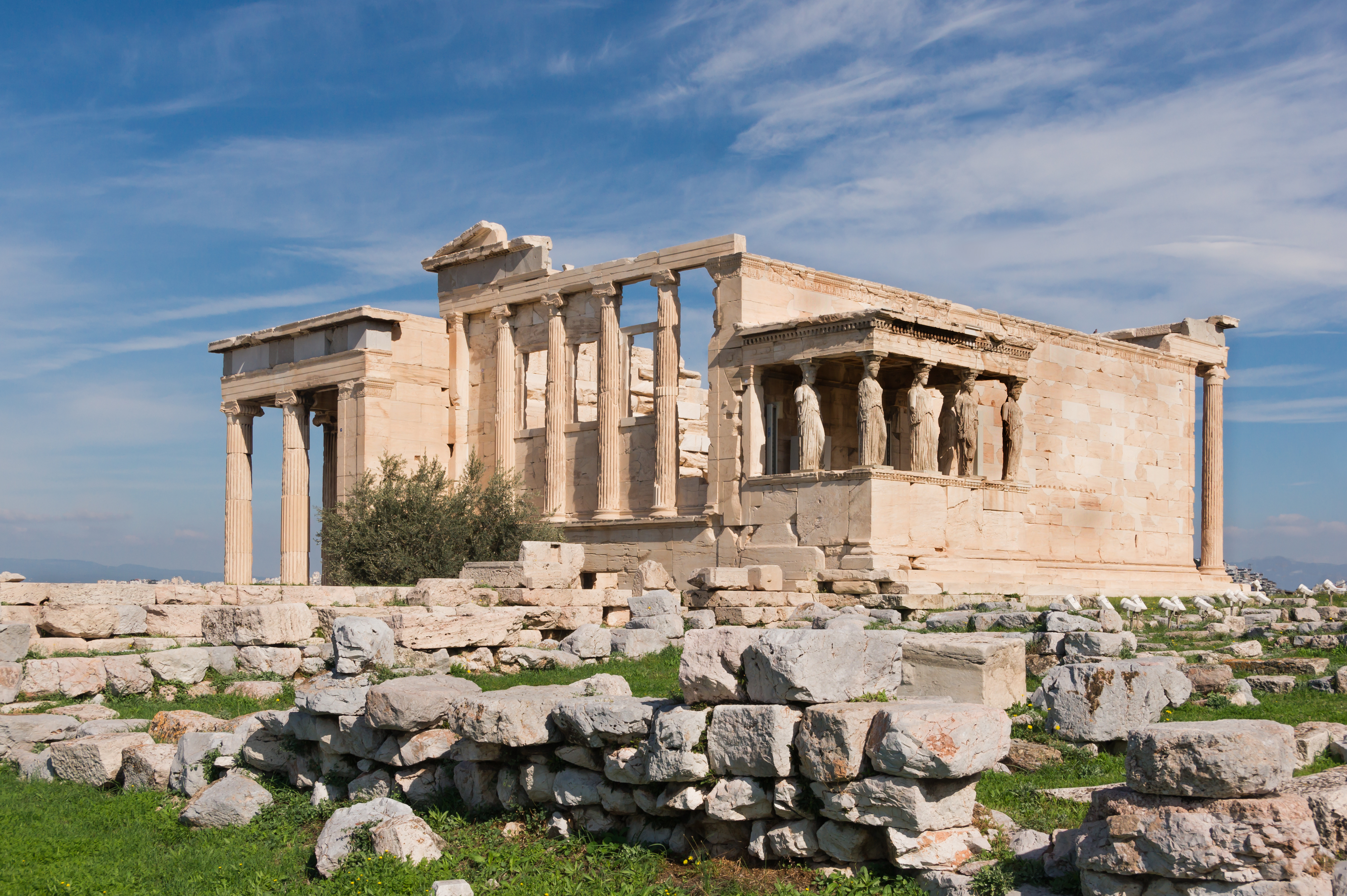

General information
- Type: Ancient Temple (Ancient Greek and Roman Period); Church (Byzantine Period); Palace (Frankish Period); Residence of the Turkish commander's harem (Ottoman Period)
- Architectural style: Ionic
- Location: Athens, Greece
- Current tenants: Museum
- Construction started: 421 BCE (2447 years ago)
- Completed: 406 BCE (2432 years ago)
- Owner: Greek government

Design and construction
- Architect: Possibly Mnesikles

The Erechtheion (/ɪˈrɛkθiən/, latinized as Erechtheum /ɪˈrɛkθiəm, ˌɛrɪkˈθiːəm/; Ancient Greek: Ἐρέχθειον, Modern Greek: Ερέχθειο) or Temple of Athena Polias is an ancient Greek Ionic temple, on the north side of the Acropolis, Athens, that was primarily dedicated to the goddess Athena.

The iconic Ionic building, which housed the statue of Athena Polias, has in modern scholarship been called the Erechtheion (the sanctuary of Erechtheus or Poseidon), in the belief that it encompassed two buildings mentioned by the Greek-Roman geographer Pausanias: the Temple of Athena Polias; and the Erechtheion.

Whether the Erechtheion referred to by Pausanias and other sources is indeed the Ionic temple or an entirely different building has become a point of contention in recent decades, however, with various scholars ruling out that Athena and Erechtheus were worshipped in a single building.

Alternative suggested locations of the true Erechtheion include the structures on the Acropolis conventionally identified as the Arrephorion, the Sanctuary of Zeus Polieus, the Sanctuary of Pandion, and the Dörpfeld foundations.

Although scholars have not yet reached consensus on this issue, the building has continued to be referred to conventionally as the Erechtheion.

In official decrees, the Ionic building is referred to using a neutral formula: "... το͂ νεὸ το͂ ἐμ πόλει ἐν ο͂ι τὸ ἀρχαῖον ἄγαλμα" ("the temple on the Acropolis within which is the ancient statue"). In other instances it is referred to as the Temple of the Polias.

The joint cult of Athena and Poseidon-Erechtheus appears to have been established on the Acropolis at a very early period, and they were even worshipped in the same temple as can, according to the traditional view, be inferred from two passages in Homer and also from later Greek texts. The extant building is the successor of several temples and buildings on the site. Its precise date of construction is unknown; it has traditionally been thought to have been built from c. 421–406 BCE, but more recent scholarship favours a date in the 430s, when it could have been part of the programme of works instigated by Pericles.

The Erechtheion is unique in the corpus of Greek temples in that its asymmetrical composition does not conform to the canon of Greek classical architecture. This is attributed either to the irregularity of the site or to the evolving and complex nature of the cults which the building housed, or it is conjectured to be the incomplete part of a larger symmetrical building. Additionally, its post-classical history of change of use, damage, and spoliation has made it one of the more problematic sites in classical archaeology. The precise nature and location of the various religious and architectural elements within the building remain the subject of debate. The temple was nonetheless a seminal example of the classical Ionic style and was highly influential on later Hellenistic, Roman, and Greek Revival architecture.

== History ==
The classical Erechtheion is the last in a series of buildings approximately on the mid-north site of the Acropolis of Athens, the earliest of which dates back to the late Bronze Age Mycenaean period. L.B. Holland conjectured that the remains under the Erechtheion was the forecourt of a palace complex similar to that of Mycenae. The scant evidence of the period LHI includes potsherds and scraps of a wall under the foundations of the Ionic temple. From the remainder of the shaft-grave period, there is nothing from LHII–LH IIIA, only from LH IIIB is there evidence of habitation in the form of terracing, children's graves, and a limestone column base. Hurwitt, arguing by analogy with population centres elsewhere from the period, maintains that there may have been a cult centre on the acropolis to the armed goddess a-ta-na-po-ti-ni-ja, which could represent the primitive origins of the Athenian cult. Additionally, the Mycenaean well and Cyclopean walls, which appear to have been in use between LH IIIB and LH IIIC, attests to attempts to fortify the hill-top as the "strong-built house of Erechtheus" recorded in the Homeric tradition. The well may be an indication of the location of the cult of Erechtheus.

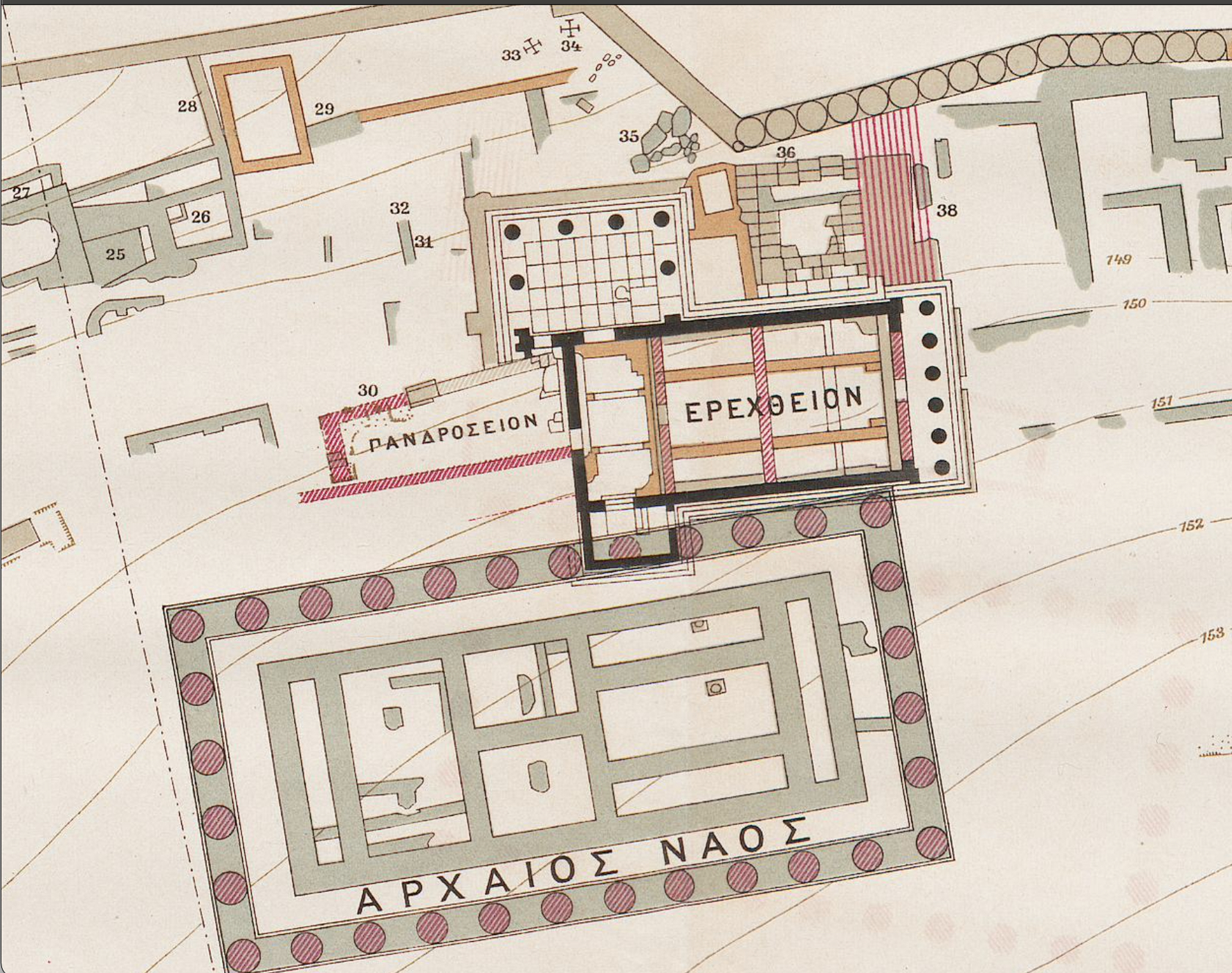
Topographical plan of the 1885 excavation of the Acropolis by Georg Kawerau, 1906. Conjectural reconstructions are in red.

The archaeology under the Erechtheion is also poorly evidenced for the archaic and early classical periods. Despite this a number of proposals have been made for a structure on the site immediately before the Achaemenid destruction of Athens in 480 BCE. Orlandos reconstructs an obliquely orientated hexastyle amphiprostyle temple, which would have contained the "trident marks" in its pronaos. Others restore a number of temene adjacent to the Temple of Athena Polias or a tetrastyle naiskos. To the south of the Erechtheion site would have been the Dörpfeld Foundations Temple, now thought to be the archaic Temple of Athena Polias, the foundations of which are visible on the acropolis today. Examination of the remains of the north edge of this temple by Korres might suggest the boundaries of the pre-Ionic Erechtheion site and therefore determine the shape of the classical temenos. Korres argues that a columnar monument marking the kekropeion would have been approximately where the Porch of the Maidens is, and that there was a stoa for the Pandroseion adjacent.

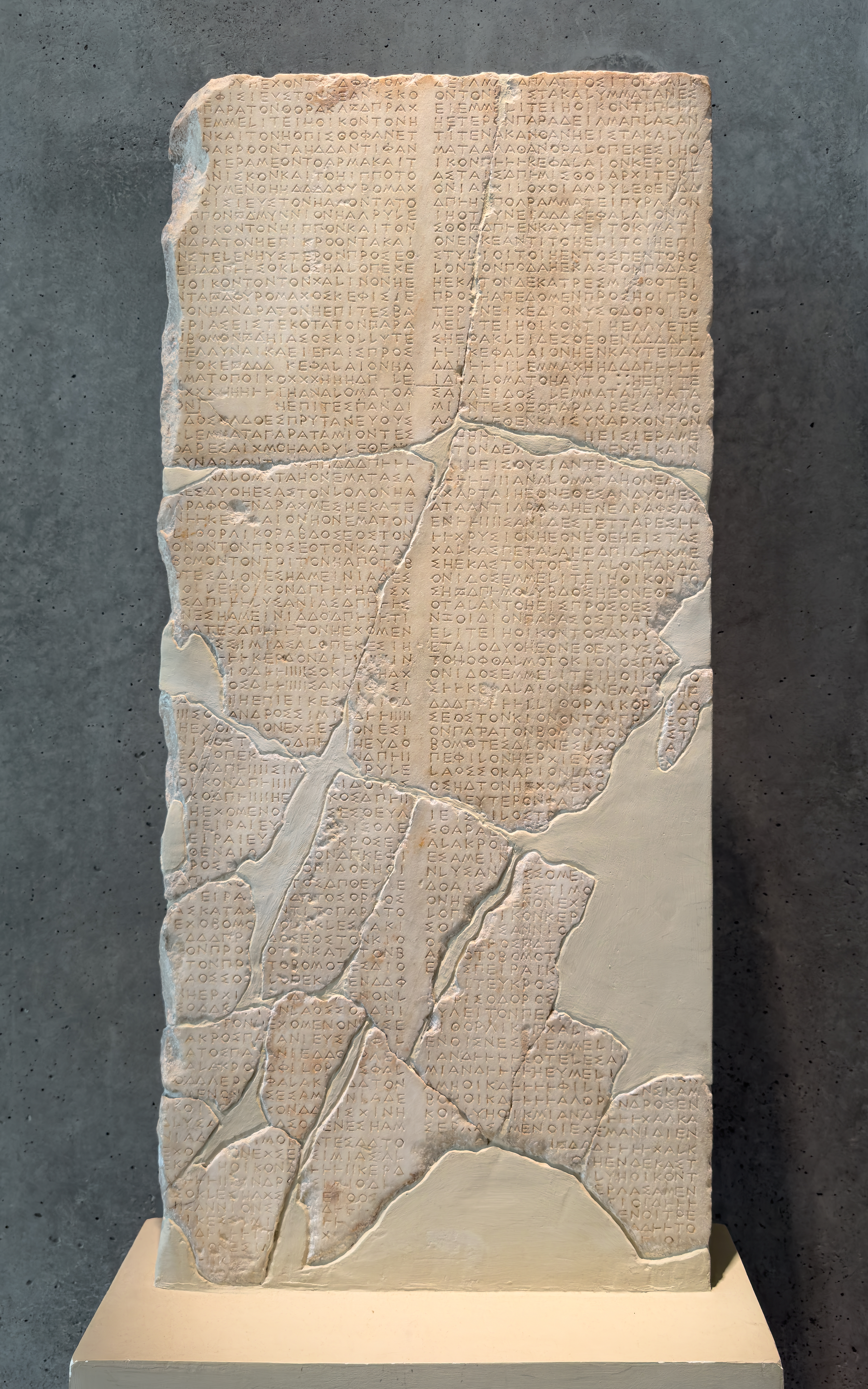
Accounts of the construction of the Erechtheion (IG I³ 476). Acropolis Museum, Athens.

The building accounts for the classical Erechtheion from 409–404 BC have survived, allowing an unusually secure dating of the construction of the temple. Nevertheless, the question remains of when the building project was inaugurated. There is no primary evidence for when construction began; it is conjectured to be either the 430s or in 421 during the Peace of Nikias. The latter is broadly the consensus view, the rationale being that this lull in the long Peloponnesian War would have been the most convenient time to begin a major construction project and that there was a likely hiatus in building during the Sicilian disaster of 413. Alternatively, dates as early as the mid-430s and as late as 412 have been put forward. Work seems to have ended in 406–405, and the last accounts were from 405–404, though some mouldings were never finished and some of the bosses of some stone blocks were not chiselled off.

The names of the architect-overseers (episkopos), Philokles and Archilochos, have come down to us. They worked on the site after 409. But the identity of the architect (architecton) is unknown. Several candidates have been suggested; namely, Mnesikles, Kallikrates, and Iktinos.

The subsequent history of the building has been one of damage, restoration and change of use, which complicates the task of reconstructing the original structure. The first recorded fire that the classical building suffered was perhaps 377–376, a second more severe fire took hold sometime in 1st century BCE or earlier followed by a campaign of repair. The Erechtheion along with the Parthenon suffered a further major destruction at some point in the 3rd or 4th century CE; whether this was due to Herulian or Visigoth attack or a natural disaster is unclear. Julian the Apostate undertook the reconstruction of the Parthenon as a pagan temple in circa 361 and 363, at which point the Parthenon was the only attested site of the cult of Athena on the Acropolis, implying that the Erechtheion had been abandoned.

In the post-classical period, the Erechtheion was subject to a number of structural changes that must be assumed to have been prompted by the building's adaptation to Christian worship. The first was its conversion to a pillared hall with a groin vaulted roof at some point in the 4th century. In the late 6th or 7th century, the Erechtheion was converted into a three-aisled basilica church with the West Corridor serving as the narthex. The central portion of the east foundations was removed to make room for a curved apse. In the 12th century, the basilica was renovated. The round apse was enlarged and was given straight sides on the exterior. The chancel screen was extended to the North and South Walls. During the Frankish occupation (1204–1458), the Erechtheion was deconsecrated and changed to a Bishop's residence, probably for the Catholic bishops of Athens who held mass in the Latin Cathedral of Church of Our Lady of Athens. With the advent of Ottoman control and the adaptation of the Acropolis plateau to a garrison, the Erechtheion took on its final incarnation as the Dizdar's harem.

More recent research has questioned whether the building was actually in use as a harem, however, as this is not found in Turkish sources. This final period of the building's use also witnessed the beginning of traveller's accounts and architectural recording of the structure along with its despoliation by antique collectors, including Elgin. This is how one of the caryatids was separated from the rest of the building and ended up in the British Museum. At one moment, Perhaps the greatest damage to the edifice came with the siege of 1826–1827, when the Maiden Porch and west facade were felled by cannon fire and the masonry joints were scavenged for lead. This ruined state is the condition of the site that prompted the first major anastylosis of the Erechtheion, by Kyriakos Pittakis between 1837 and 1840.

== Architecture ==
Floor plan of the Erechtheion, in its present-day state.

Externally, the temple is an Ionic hexastyle, prostyle pronaos which faces east. The building is in Pentelic marble with a blue Eleusinian limestone frieze. The temple's walls were constructed in ashlar isodomic masonry. The east porch doesn't exhibit any entasis, but the stylobate is curved. The naos is apparently divided in two, with the floor of the western part of the building 3 meters (10 ft) lower than the eastern section but with identical ceiling height. The western end of the naos has three entrances. On the north of the western naos is a great door and step leading to the lower Ionic prostyle, dipteral tetrastyle porch of six columns, with a distinctive double anta at the north-west corner.

Next to this porch is an outside terrace and steps leading to the east porch. East of the north doorway is an underground opening that leads to a crypt under the north porch with a pit for snakes. On the west end of the north elevation of the western naos, a further door and step lead to a walled temenos, the Sanctuary of Pandrosos, where the Pandroseion, tomb of Kekrops, altar of Zeus Herkeios and the sacred olive tree of Athena would have been.

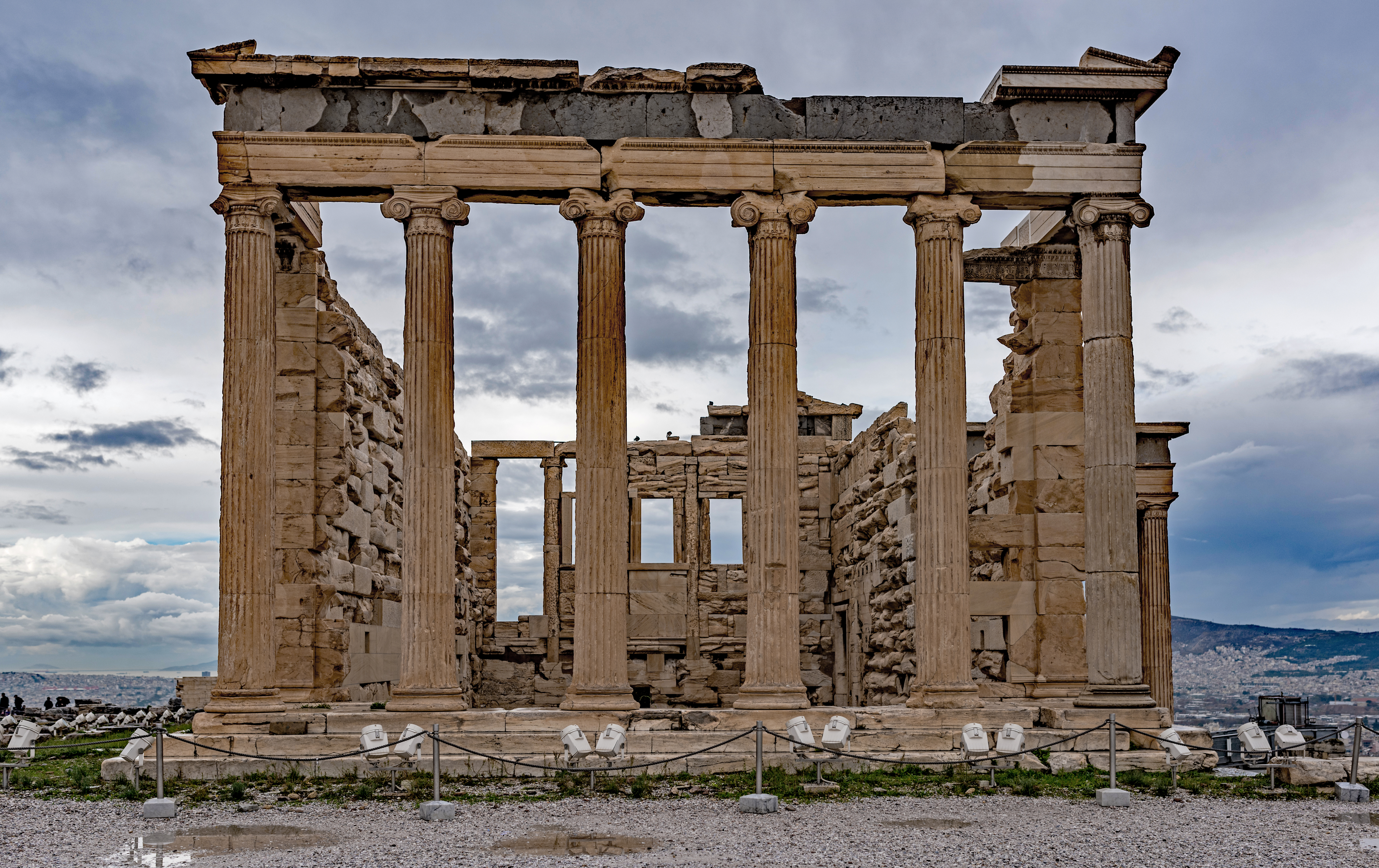
East façade.

On the south wall of the western naos was an L-shaped staircase which leads to the higher Porch of the Maidens (or Caryatid Porch, or Korai Porch), a prostyle tetrastyle porch, or pteron, having six sculpted female figures as supports, all facing south and standing on a low wall. The only entrance to the Porch of the Maidens was the stairway from the interior of the naos. The western end is a double-height space, and at the second-storey level, the outside west facing wall has an engaged base moulding with four engaged columns topped by Ionic capitals. The spaces between these columns were of open grillwork. From the outside, the western facade would have had the appearance of having a floor at the same level as the eastern naos. The coffered ceiling of the north porch is continued at the Porch of the Maidens.

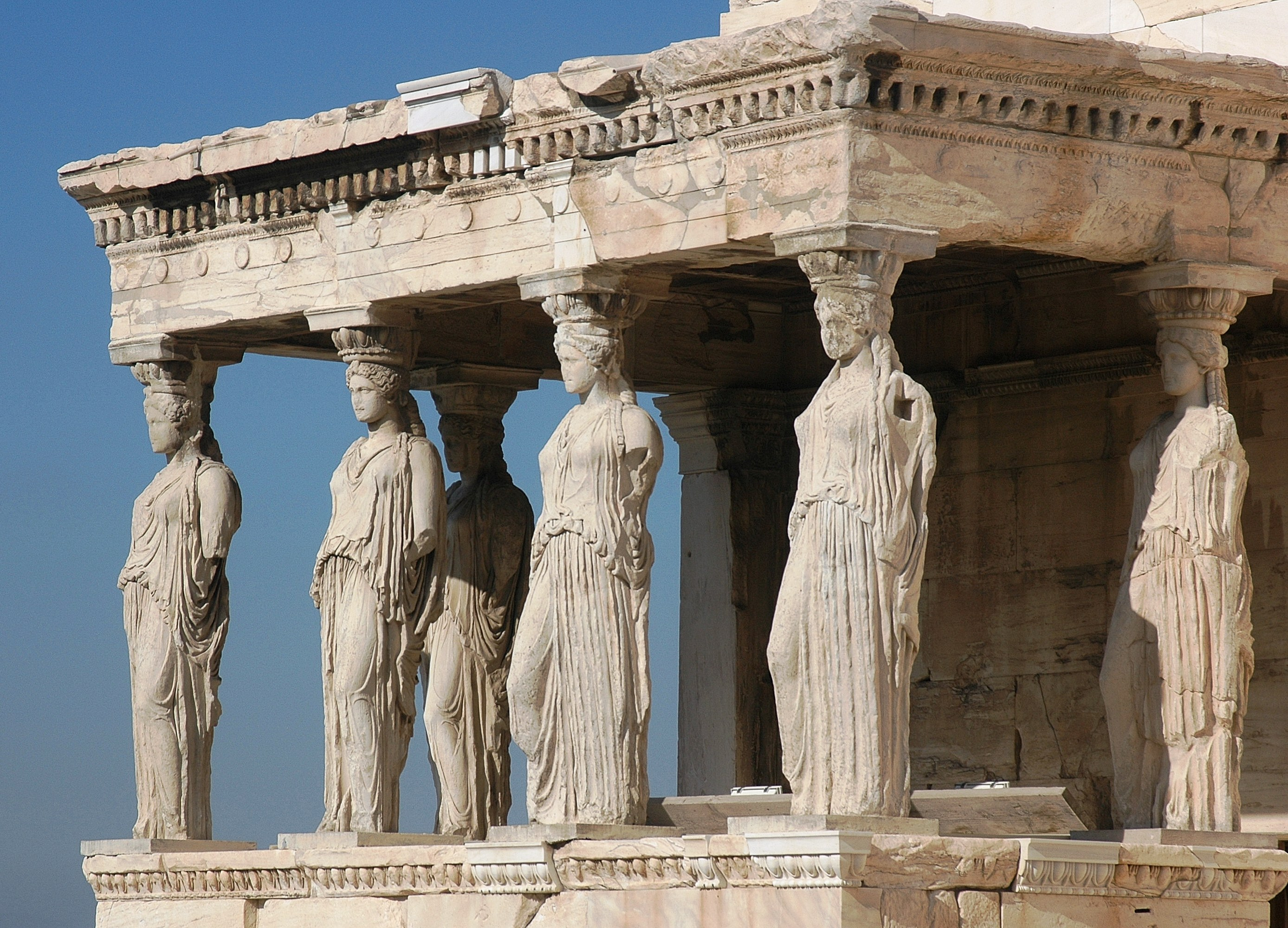
The Porch of the Maidens

No wholly satisfactory account of the interior layout of the Erechtheion from antiquity exists, since over time it has been entirely erased. The points of contention are whether and where there was an internal dividing wall, and whether the building had two storeys as suggested by Pausanias' description of it as a διπλοῦν... οἴκημα. The conventional view of the reconstruction of the interior of the Erechtheion naos is that it was divided in two in imitation of the opisthodomos of the archaic temple of Athena Polias, and that the altar of Athena was in the west half of the chamber, while the altars of Erechtheus, Poseidon, and Boutes were in the other. An alternative view is that the Erechtheion was a replacement for the east cella of the archaic Temple of Athena and would have had an east cross wall.

== Sculpture ==
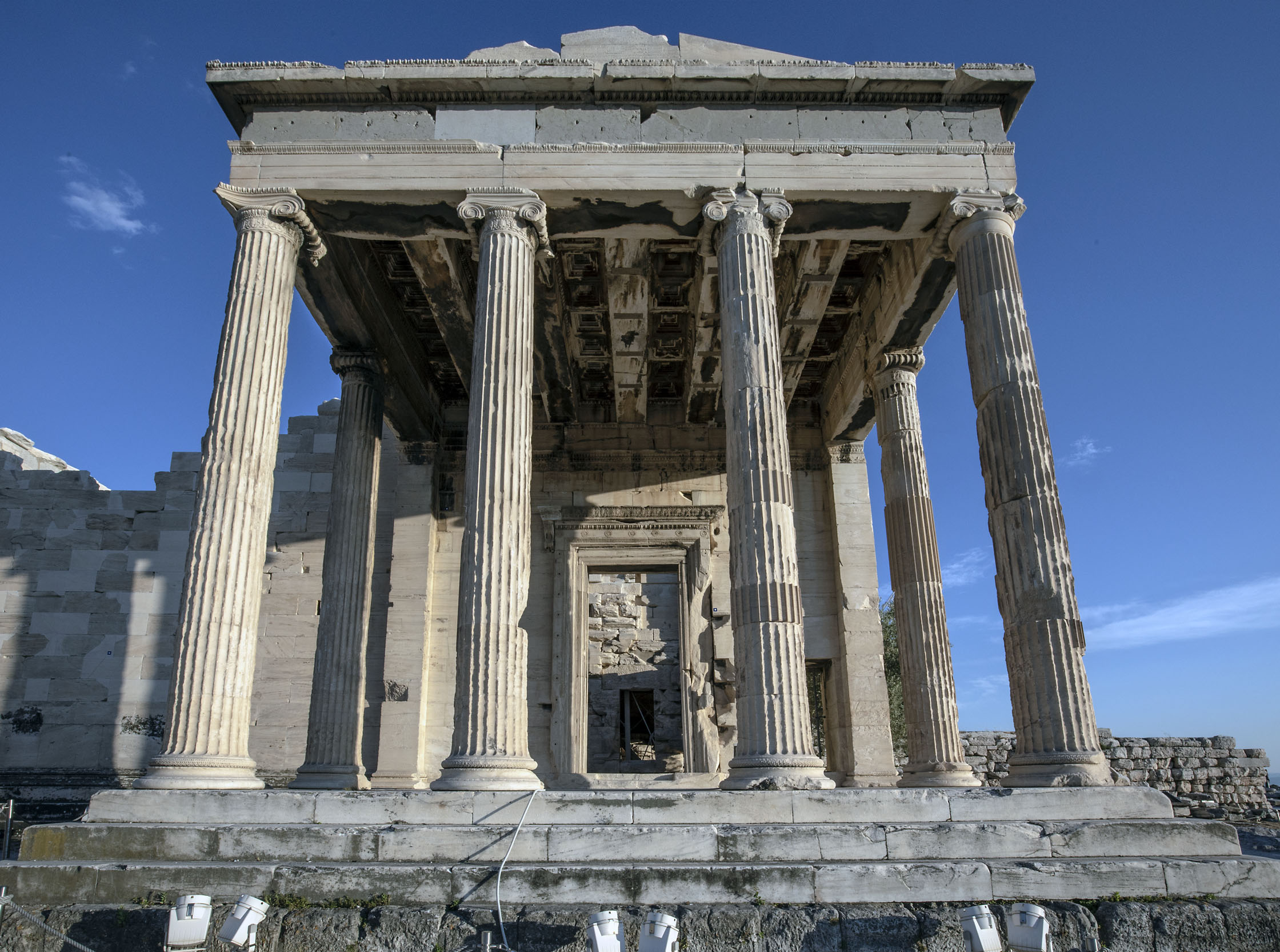
North portico.

The Erechtheion has two figural sculptural programmes: the frieze; and the korai of the Maiden porch. The entablature of the naos and north porch has a frieze of blue Eleusinian limestone that was decorated with white Pentelic marble figures attached by means of iron dowels. This "cameo-like" effect of the contrasting stones was unique among Ionic temples and rare in any other applications. Of the sculpted elements, 112 fragments of the frieze have survived, perhaps 80% of the figures. Attempts to match dowel hole to figure have not been successful, and therefore the order of the figures and overall theme of frieze remains unclear. However, several attempts to identify individual scenes within the sequence of figures have been made. According to Pallat, the north porch had a chariot race with a quadriga on the west face and Athena catching the daughters of Kekrops opening the basket containing Erichthonios on the north and the birth of Ericthonios on the east.

Other suggestions for aspects of the narrative of the frieze include the story of Ion, the sacrifice of Erectheus' daughters to save Athens and the departure of Erechtheus for the battle with Eumolpos. Peter Schultz's recent reinterpretation of the standing god and goddesses on the east porch of the Nike Athena temple as the birth of Athena invites comparison with the birth scene on the Parthenon pediment and has prompted the question of whether there is a tradition of birth scenes in Attic sculpture that was continued on the Erechtheion frieze. As is typical of the Ionic style, the Erechtheion has no pediment sculpture.

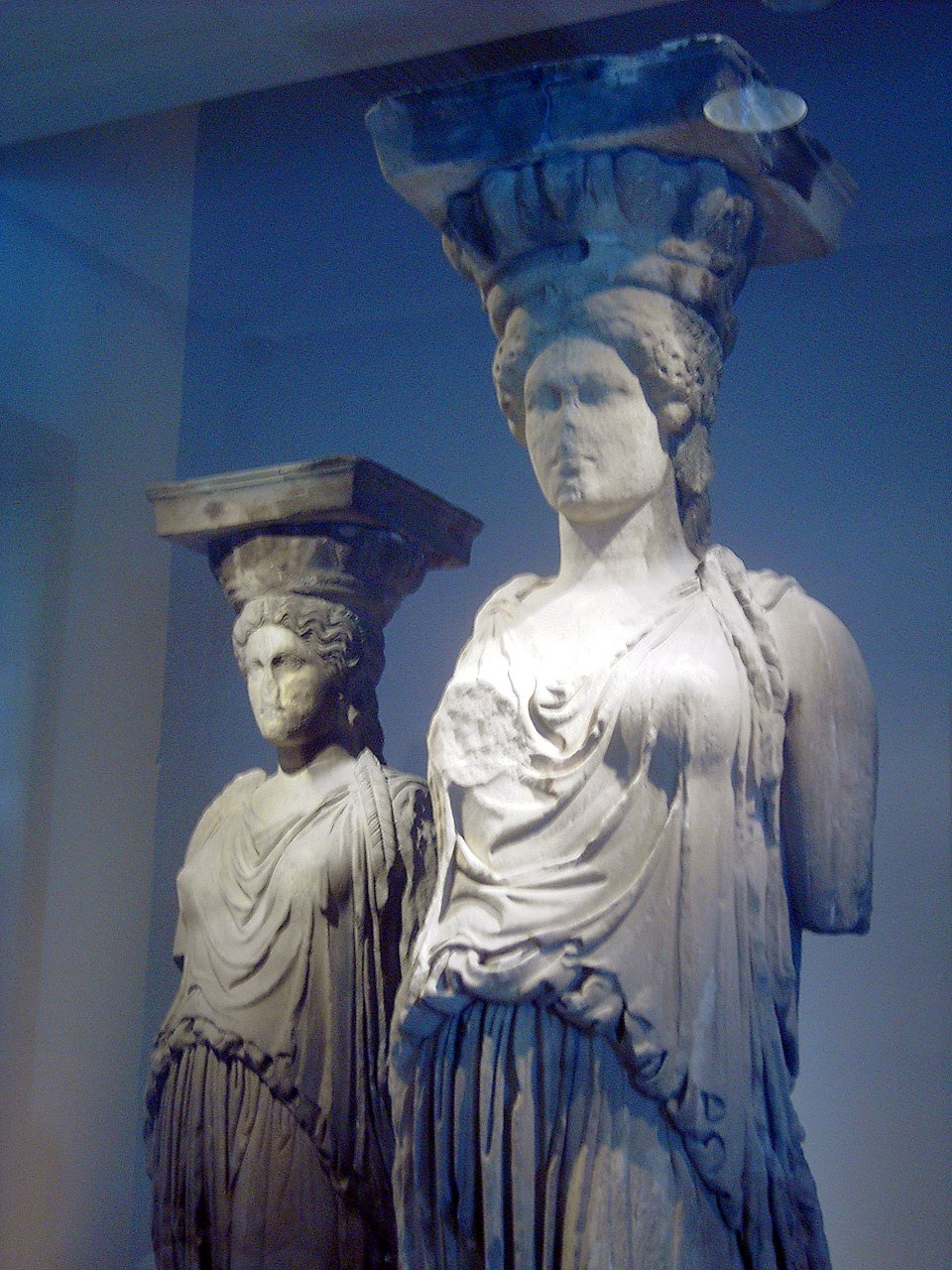
Original figures in the Acropolis Museum.

Several theories have been proposed about the function and significance of the Maiden Porch. Kontoleon has argued that it served as a monopteral heroön to the tomb of Kekrops. Scholl has argued that the korai are mourners for Kekrops because of the association of caryatids with tombs. Shear disputes this is a tomb since it does not follow the pattern of other religious tokens. For Shear the architectural supports are derived from the bases of the columns of the Temple of Artemis at Ephesus and are typical of the miniaturization of elements of the Ionic style when it was imported from Asia Minor to the Greek mainland. Nor was the use of korai as an architectural support element a novelty, as they were used before in the Siphnian Treasury at Delphi and perhaps the Kore of Lyons and therefore represent the classical expression of an established archaic tradition.

Another open question has been the problem of the identity of the korai. In the building accounts, they are referred to as korai or maidens. The lower arms of all the caryatids have been lost. In 1952 the discovery of copies from Tivoli revealed that the korai carried phiale, suggesting that they might be either the arrephoroi (as "bearers of unmentionable things") or kanephoroi. The six korai of the porch all exhibit subtle variations, implying that they do not represent a repetition of a single person or deity but a group of individuals. Lesk argues that they may have been intended as a replacement for the (highly individuated) Acropolis korai that were destroyed by the Persians and in this capacity represent the servants of Athena who stood ready to make libation to the cult statue housed inside. Vickers suggests not only a later date for the construction of the Erechtheion but that the korai are actually Vitruvian caryatids and represent a memorial to Athens's humiliation in the Peloponnesian War.

The Erechtheion is a "remarkably luxurious" building in the detailing of its mouldings. Lotus-palmette chains (anthemion) decorate the column capitals and epicranitis of the temple. Additionally, egg-and-dart, egg and leaf, bead and reel, Lesbian cyma, guilloches, and rosettes are liberally placed around the entablature, door and window frames, and the coffering of the ceilings. The capitals were gilded and the braidings at the column bases were studded with coloured glass.

== Cult objects ==
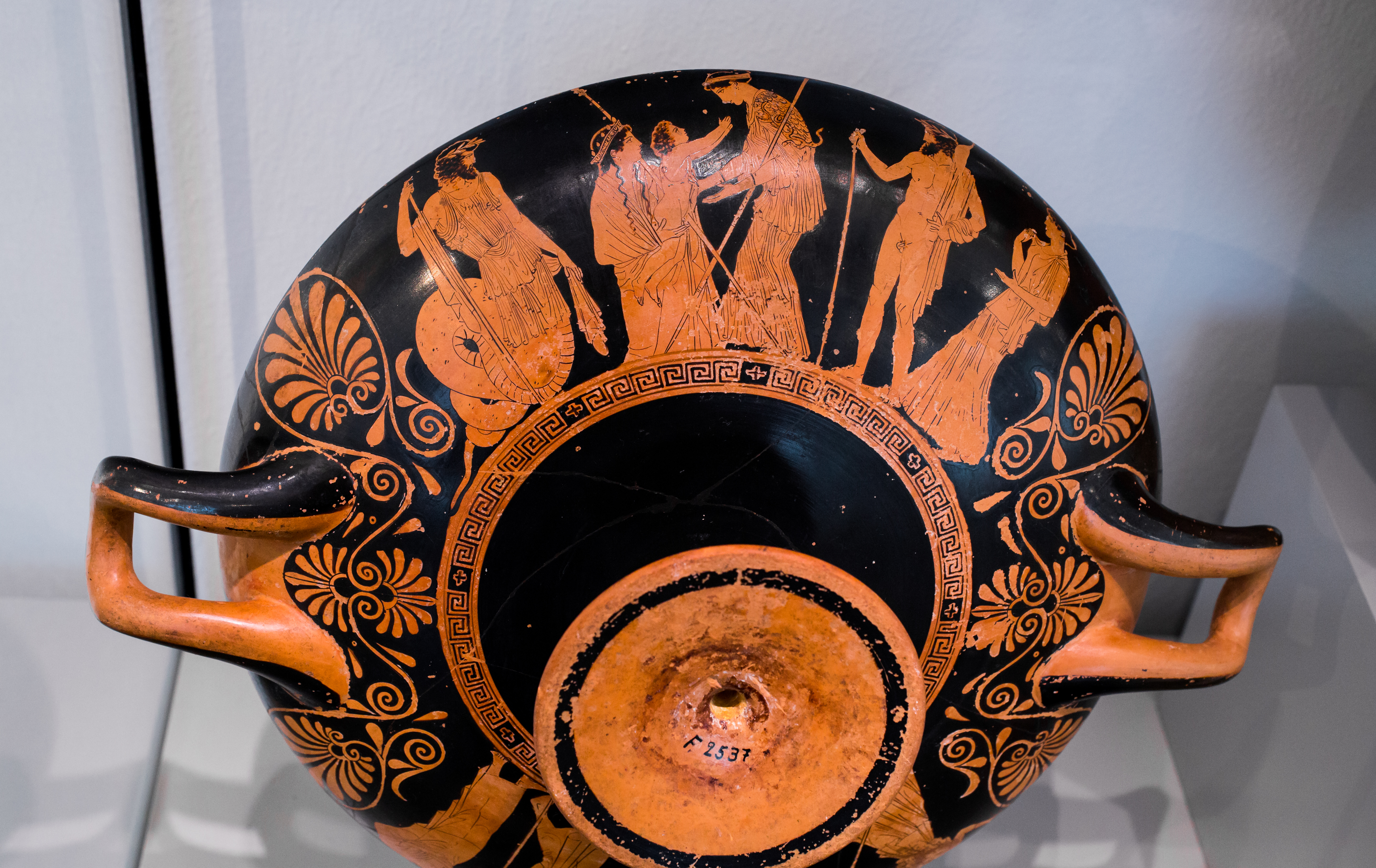
Birth of Erechthonios by the Kodros Painter, c. 440–435 BCE. Here Erechtheus is depicted witnessing the birth of Erichthonius, and illustrates the chthonic origins of the polis.

The Erechtheion potentially served as a reliquary for an assortment of religious items rather than being dedicated to a single deity, as was usually the case. Ludwig Pallat posits that the Erechtheion is the expression of the autochthonic nature of Athenian identity. J.H. Clements argues that the Erechtheion was built to house a diverse collection of religious objects, akin to a "'museum of curiosities' for the collections of religious objects", and that it is problematic to draw an overall theme for the religious purpose of the temple.

The cults of the Erechtheion encompass the birth of Erichthonius from the soil of Attica; the tomb of Kekrops, mythical king and cult hero to the Athenians; and their relationship to the tutelary deities of the city. For many years, the accepted scholarly opinion has been that the Erechtheion fulfilled a triplicate purpose in its interior design: to "replace the Old Temple [of Athena], to house the old image, and to unite in an organized building several shrines and places of religious significance."

The following may be the product of an attempted syncretism or merely a bricolage of relics accrued over time. On the east porch, immediately before the temple door, was an altar to Zeus Hypatos. Continuing inside in the eastern chamber of the naos would have been the altars to Poseidon and Erechtheus, Hephaistos and Boutes, and thrones of the temple priests. It is here that Athena's peplos might have been displayed. In the western section, there may have been the tomb of Erechtheus, the xoanon of Athena Polias and perhaps immediately before that a table. Additionally, this room housed the Lamp of Kallimachos, a Hermes, the saltwater well and a collection of spoils from the Persian War. To the north of this chamber was the north porch whose coffered ceiling was pierced supposedly as the entry point of one of Poseidon's thunderbolts; indentations below were thought to be the resulting trident marks. The altar of Thyechoos stood over the trident marks. Continuing outside was the sanctuary precinct, which may have contained the sacred olive tree, the snake pit, the Tomb of Kekrops and the Pandrosieon.

== Scholarship and conservation ==
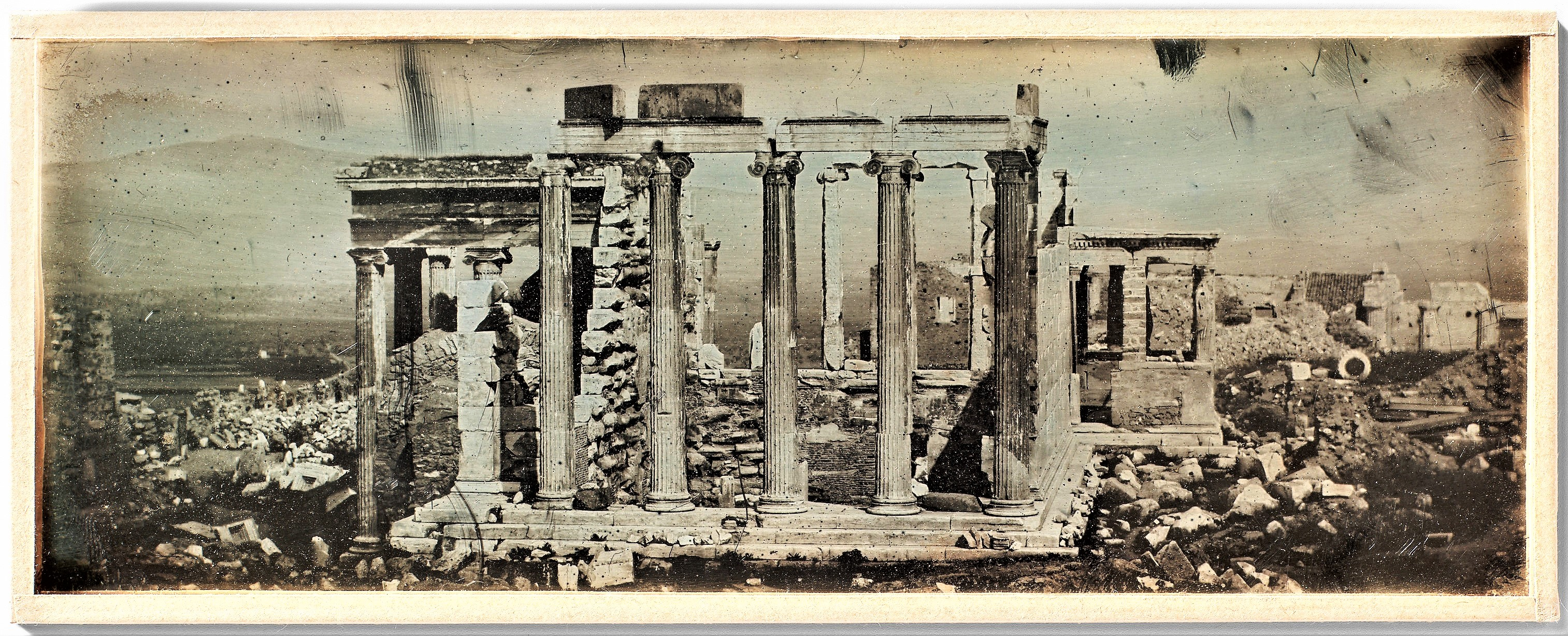
Joseph-Philibert Girault de Prangey: 62. Athènes. Temple de Minerve Poliade. Daguerreotype, 1842. The first photograph of the Erechtheion – image is laterally reversed; the war damage is still evident as well as the opus Elgin in the Maiden Porch.

Travellers' accounts of the Erechtheion are relatively scarce before the 18th century, when relations between the Ottoman Empire and Europe began to improve and access to Greece was opened. Moreover, the building north of the Parthenon was not identified with Pausanias' description of the Temple of Athena Polias until Spon and Wheler's account of the topography of the acropolis published in 1682. Their use of ancient sources in the identification of ancient buildings rather than local folklore, as had been the case before, was innovative and presaged the beginning of scholarship with regard to the Erechtheion.

In this same spirit came the work of Richard Pococke, who published the first reconstruction of the temple in 1745 and who was the first to conjecture the existence of a larger, symmetrical building. Later, Stuart and Revett published the first accurate measured drawings of the Erechtheion in the second volume of their Antiquities of Athens in 1787. This book, perhaps more than any other, was influential in disseminating the Ionic style and the form of the Erechtheion amongst architects and an appreciative public in the 18th and 19th centuries.

For a record of the temple's condition prior to its destruction during the Greek War of Independence, there are the detailed drawings of William Gell. Gell's period of study in 1800–1801 coincided with the activity of Lord Elgin, whose despoliation of the Maiden Porch was, at the time, more controversial than his removal of the Parthenon sculptures.

In the post-revolutionary period, ambitious plans were drawn up to clear the Acropolis and build a royal palace for the newly installed Bavarian king. Although no such palace was built, the plateau was cleared of much of the post-classical accretions, which were thought to obscure the site, and left as a monument and archaeological site.

For the Erechtheion this meant the remnants of the Frankish North Addition, the Venetian vault in the North Porch, the Ottoman masonry structure in the angle of the westward projection of the North Porch and the West Façade, and the Frankish and Ottoman alterations of the interior were removed. The first attempted reconstruction of the damaged building was Pittakis's in 1839–1840. The second anastylosis was Nikolaos Balanos's in 1902–1909. Dissatisfaction with Balanos's haphazard placement of the ashlar blocks and his use of steel joints that caused additional damage led to the creation of the interdisciplinary Acropolis Restoration Service in 1975, whose conservation work is ongoing.

== Bibliography ==
- Boulter, Patricia (1970). "The Frieze of the Erechtheion". Antike Plastik (10): 1–7.
- Camp, John M. (2001). The Archaeology of Athens. Yale. ISBN 9780300081978.
- Harris, Diane (1995). The Treasures of the Parthenon and Erechtheion. Oxford.
- Hurwit, J. (1999). The Athenian Acropolis: History, Mythology, and Archaeology from the Neolithic Era to the Present. Cambridge.
- Jenkins, Ian (2006). Greek Architecture and Its Sculpture. Cambridge.
- Lauter, Hans (1976). Die Koren des Erechtheion [The korai of the Erechtheion]. Berlin, Germany: Mann. ISBN 3-7861-2229-6.
- Lesk, A.L. (2004). A Diachronic Examination of the Erechtheion and its Reception (PDF) (Ph.D.). University of Cincinnati. Archived from the original (PDF) on 2022-12-24.
- Neils, Jennifer, ed. (1992). Goddess and Polis: The Panathenaic Festival in Ancient Athens. The Trustees of Dartmouth College.
- Pallat, Ludwig (1912). "The Frieze of the Erechtheum". American Journal of Archaeology. 16 (2): 175–202. doi:10.2307/497279. JSTOR 497279. S2CID 193084850.
- Pallat, Ludwig (1935). "Der Fries der Nordhalle des Erechtheion". Jahrbuch des Deutschen Archäologischen Instituts. 50: 75–137.
- Papanikolaou, Alexandros (2012). Η αποκατάσταση του Ερεχθείου (1979–1987). Η απόδοση του έργου. Acropolis Restoration Service.
- Paton, J.M.; Caskey, L.D.; Fowler, H.N.; Stevens, G.P. (1927). The Erechtheum. Harvard.
- Pirenne-Delforge, V. (2010). "Un oikèma appelé Érechtheion (Pausanias, I, 26, 5)". In Carlier, P.; Lerouge-Cohen, C. (eds.). Paysage et religion en Grèce antique. Mélanges offerts à Madeleine Jost. pp. 147–163.
- Rhodes, Robin Francis (1995). Architecture and Meaning on the Athenian Acropolis. Cambridge.
- Shear, Ione Mylonas (1999). "Maidens in Greek Architecture: The Origin of the 'Caryatids'". Bulletin de Correspondance Hellénique. 123 (1): 65–85. doi:10.3406/bch.1999.7211.
- Shear, T. Leslie Jr. (2016). Trophies of Victory: Public Building in Periklean Athens. Princeton.
- Wycherley, R.E. (1978). The Stones of Athens. Princeton.
