= Pelasgic wall =

Coordinates: 37.9714°N 23.7253°E

The Pelasgic wall or Pelasgian fortress or Enneapylon (Greek: Εννεαπύλον; nine-gated) was a monument supposed to have been built by the Pelasgians, after levelling the summit of the rock on the Acropolis of Athens. The wall was believed to be 6 m (20 ft) thick according to archaeological remains of the site. Thucydides and Aristophanes call it "Pelargikon", "Stork wall or place". "Pelargikon" refers to the line of walls at the western foot of the Acropolis. During the time of Thucydides, the wall was said to have stood several meters high with a large, visible fragment at 6 m (20 ft) broad, located on to the south of the present Propylaia and close to the earlier gateway. Today, the beveling can be seen but the foundation of the wall lies below the level of the present hill.

The Parian Chronicle mentions that the Athenians expelled the Peisistratids from the "Pelasgikon teichos". Herodotus relates that before the expulsion of the Pelasgians from Attica, the land under Hymettus had been given to them as a dwelling-place in reward for the wall that had once been built around the Acropolis.

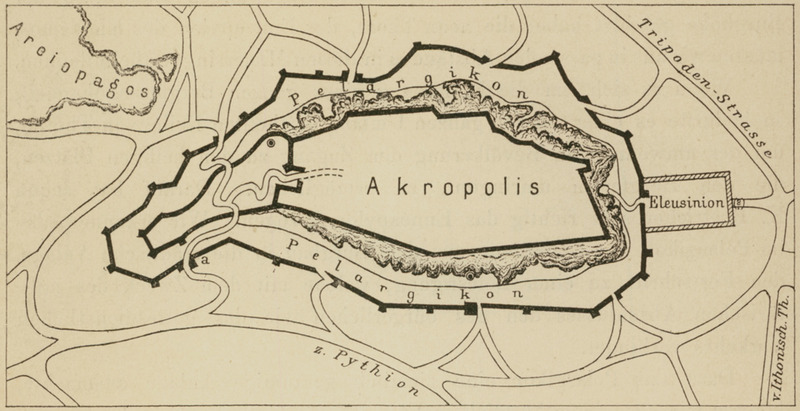
Sketch of the course of the Pelasgic wall.

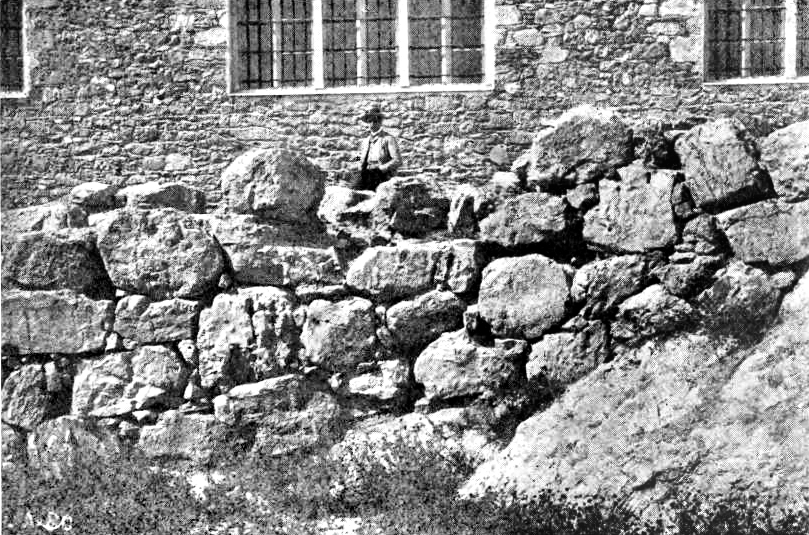
Pelasgic wall on the summit of the Acropolis, south of the Modern Museum

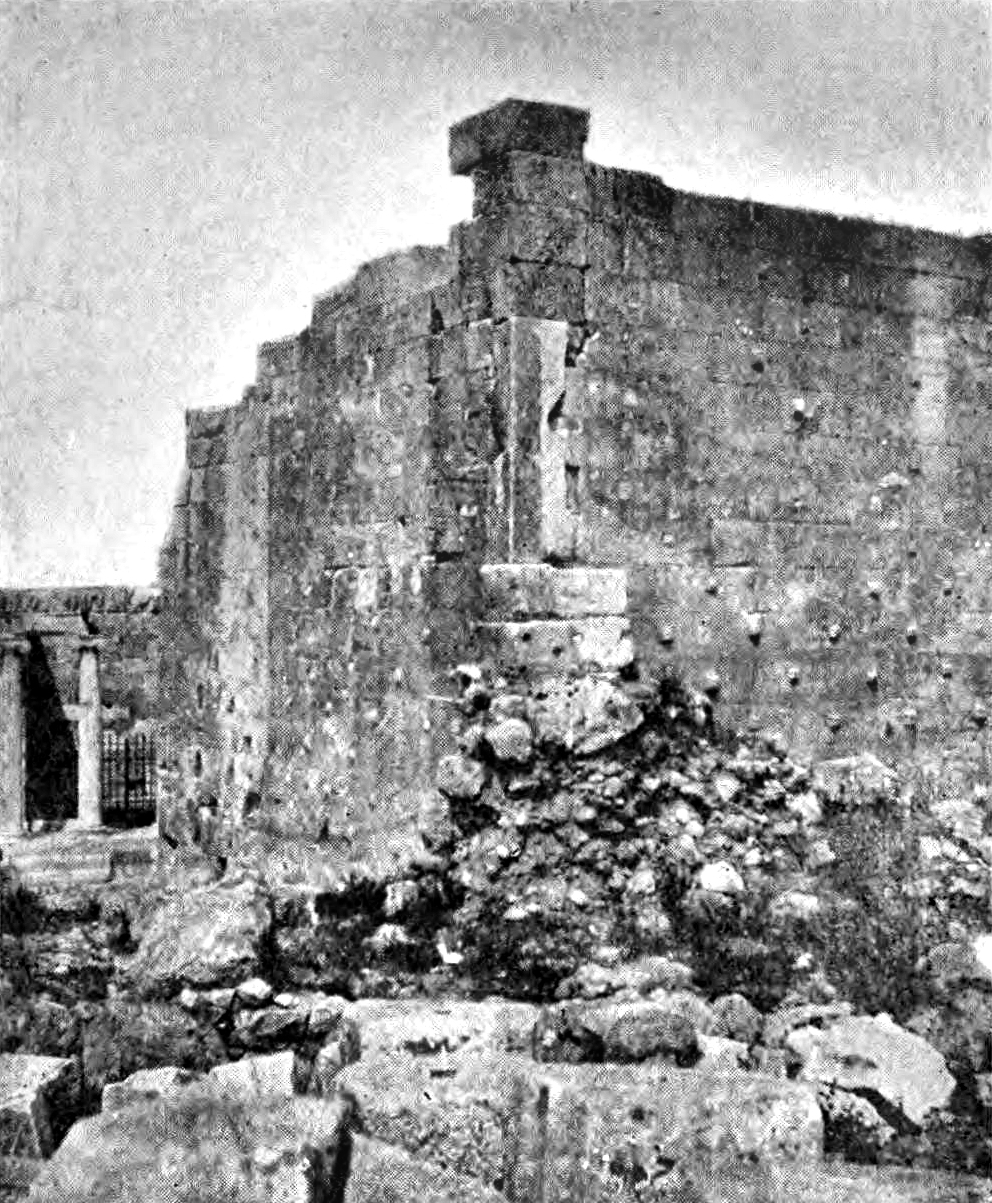
Southwest wing of the Propylaea and Pelasgic wall.

== Bibliography ==
- Jane Ellen Harrison, Primitive Athens as Described by Thucydides, Cambridge,
- Anna Maria Theocharaki, The Ancient Circuit Walls of Athens, 2019.
- Spyros Iakōvidēs, The Mycenaean Acropolis of Athens, 2006.
- Eirini M. Dimitriadou, Early Athens: Settlements and Cemeteries in the Submycenaean, Geometric and Archaic Periods, Monumenta Archaeologica 42, 2019.
