= Acropolis of Athens =

Ancient citadel above the city of Athens

Acropolis, Athens
UNESCO World Heritage Site
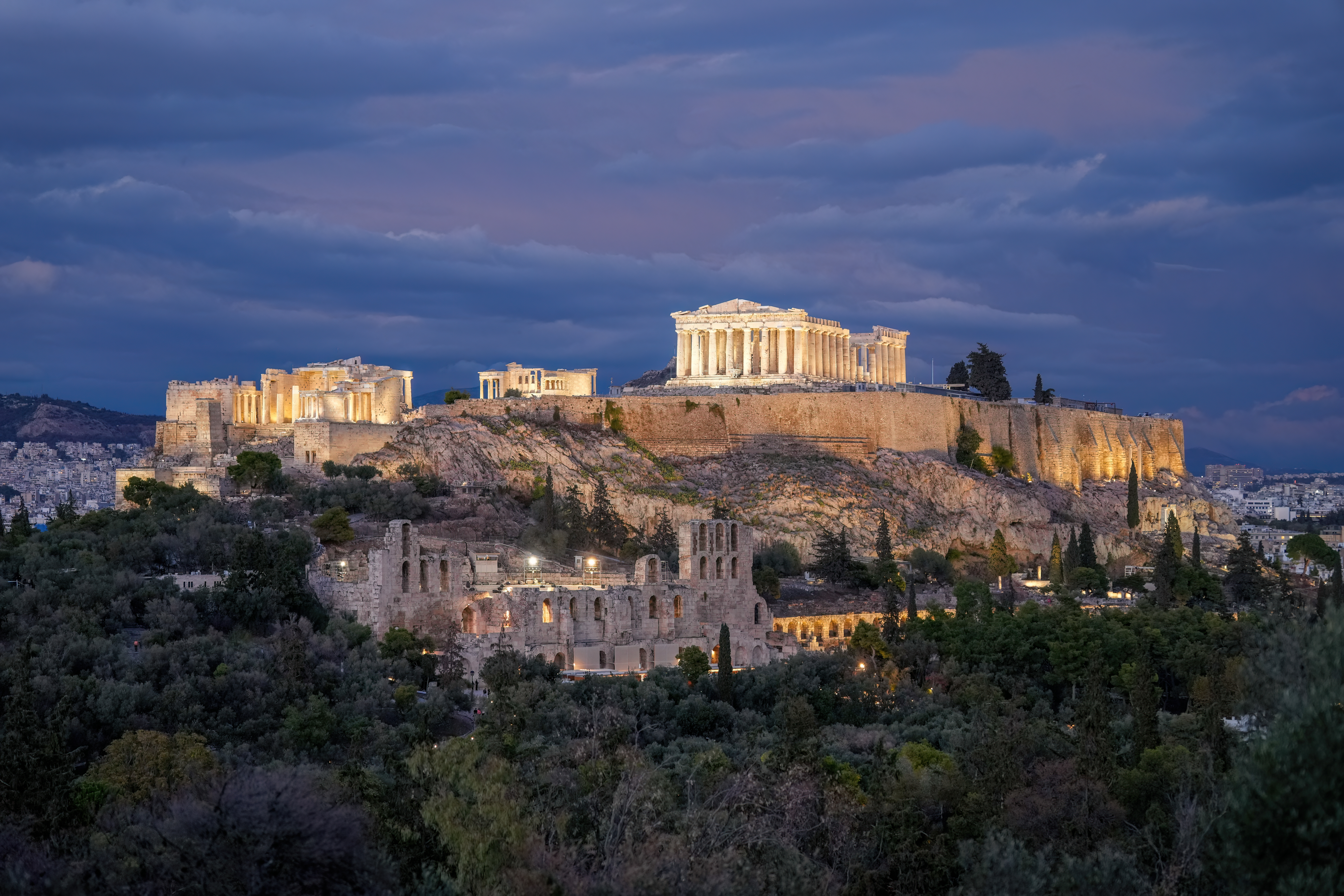
- The Acropolis of Athens in 2025

- Location within Greece
- Location: Athens, Attica, Greece
- Criteria: Cultural: i, ii, iii, iv, vi
- Reference: 404
- Inscription: 1987 (11th Session)
- Area: 3.04 ha (7.5 acres)
- Buffer zone: 116.71 ha (288.4 acres)
- Coordinates: 37°58′18″N 23°43′34″E

The Acropolis of Athens (Ancient Greek: Ἡ Ἀκρόπολις τῶν Ἀθηνῶν, romanized: Hē Akropolis tōn Athēnōn; Modern Greek: Η Ακρόπολη των Αθηνών, romanized: I Akrópoli ton Athinón) is an ancient citadel located on a rocky outcrop above the city of Athens, Greece, and contains the remains of several ancient buildings of great architectural and historical significance, the most famous being the Parthenon. The word Acropolis is from Greek ἄκρον (akron) 'highest point, extremity' and πόλις (polis) 'city'. The term acropolis is generic and there are many other acropoleis in Greece. During ancient times the Acropolis of Athens was also more properly known as Cecropia (Κεκροπία), after the legendary serpent-man Cecrops, the supposed first Athenian king.

While there is evidence that the hill was inhabited as early as the 4th millennium BC, it was Pericles (c. 495–429 BC) in the fifth century BC who coordinated the construction of the buildings whose present remains are the site's most important ones, including the Parthenon, the Propylaea, the Erechtheion and the Temple of Athena Nike. The Parthenon and the other buildings were seriously damaged during the 1687 siege by the Venetians during the Morean War when gunpowder being stored by the Turkish rulers in the Parthenon was hit by a Venetian bombardment and exploded.

== History ==
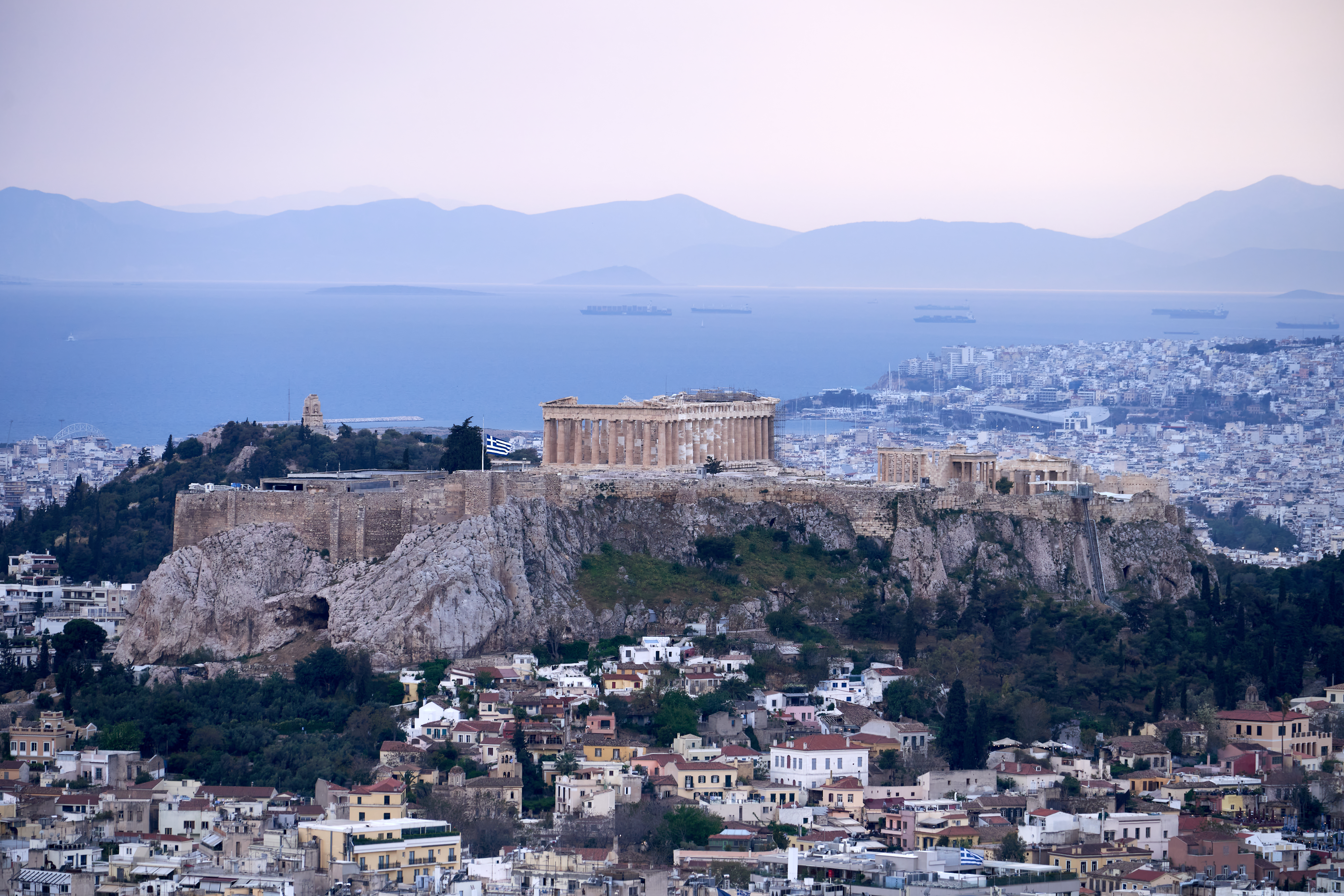
The Acropolis of Athens as seen from Mount Lycabettus. The wooded Hill of the Nymphs is half-visible on its right, and Philopappos Hill on the left, immediately behind. The Philopappos Monument is seen here where, in the distant background, the coast of Peloponnese meets the waters of the Saronic Gulf.

=== Early settlement ===
The Acropolis is located on a flattish-topped rock that rises 150 m (490 ft) above sea level in the city of Athens, with a surface area of about 3 ha (7.4 acres). While the earliest artifacts date to the Middle Neolithic era, there have been documented habitations in Attica from the Early Neolithic period (6th millennium BC).

There can be little doubt that a Mycenaean megaron palace stood upon the hill during the late Bronze Age. Nothing of this structure survives except, probably, a single limestone column base and pieces of several sandstone steps. Soon after the palace was constructed, a massive Cyclopean circuit wall was built, 760 m (2,490 ft) long, up to 10 m (32 ft 10 in) high, and ranging 3.5 m (11 ft 6 in) to 6 m (19 ft 8 in) thick. From the end of the Late Helladic IIIB (1300–1200 BC) on, this wall would serve as the main defense for the acropolis until the 5th century. The wall consisted of two parapets built with large stone blocks and cemented with an earth mortar called emplekton (Greek: ἔμπλεκτον). The wall uses typical Mycenaean conventions in that it followed the natural contour of the terrain and its gate, which was towards the south, was arranged obliquely, with a parapet and tower overhanging the incomers' right-hand side, thus facilitating defense. There were two lesser approaches up the hill on its north side, consisting of steep, narrow flights of steps cut in the rock. Homer is assumed to refer to this fortification when he mentions the "strong-built house of Erechtheus" (Odyssey 7.81). At some time before the 13th century BC, an earthquake caused a fissure near the northeastern edge of the Acropolis. This fissure extended some 35 m (115 ft) to a bed of soft marl in which a well was dug. An elaborate set of stairs was built and the well served as an invaluable, protected source of drinking water during times of siege for some portion of the Mycenaean period.

=== Archaic Acropolis ===
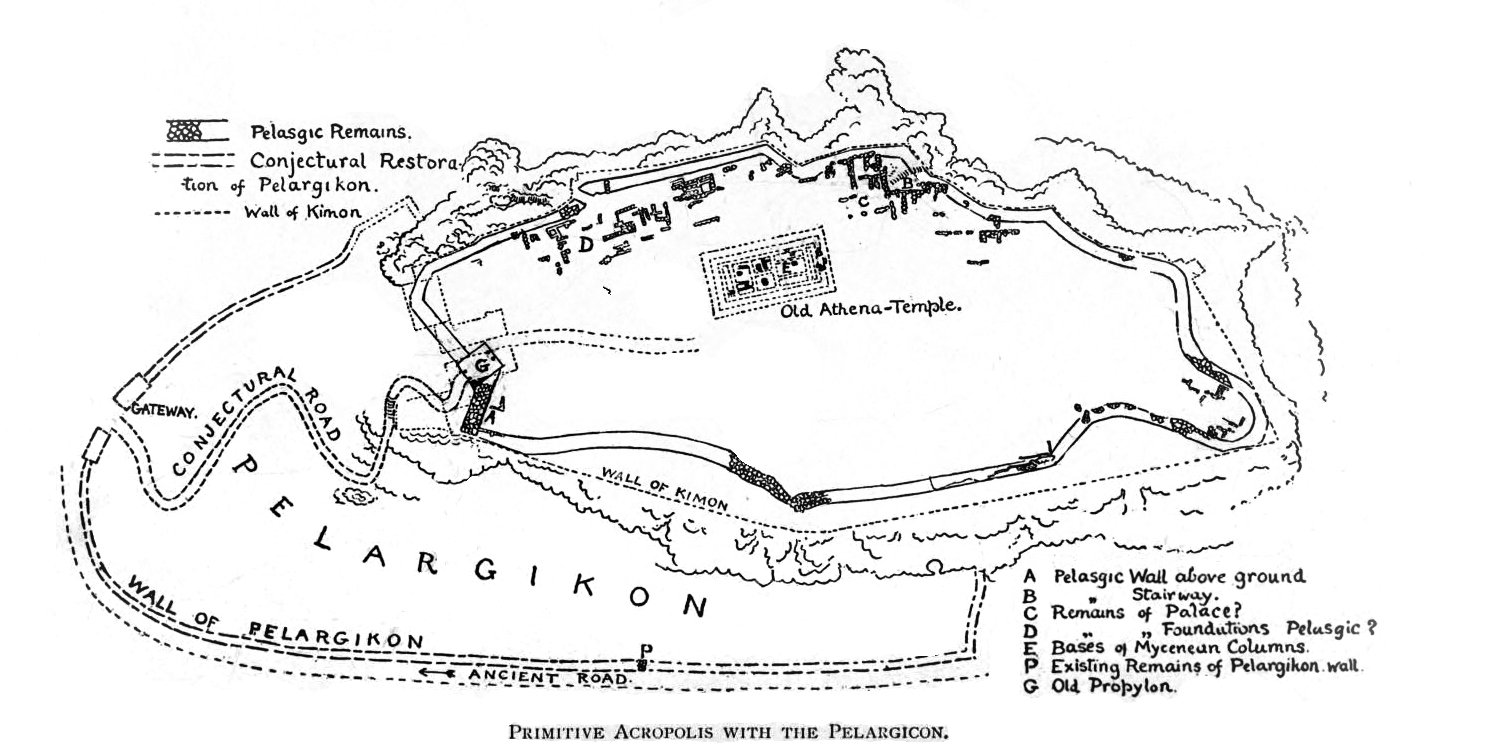
Primitive Acropolis with the Pelargicon and the Old Temple of Athena.

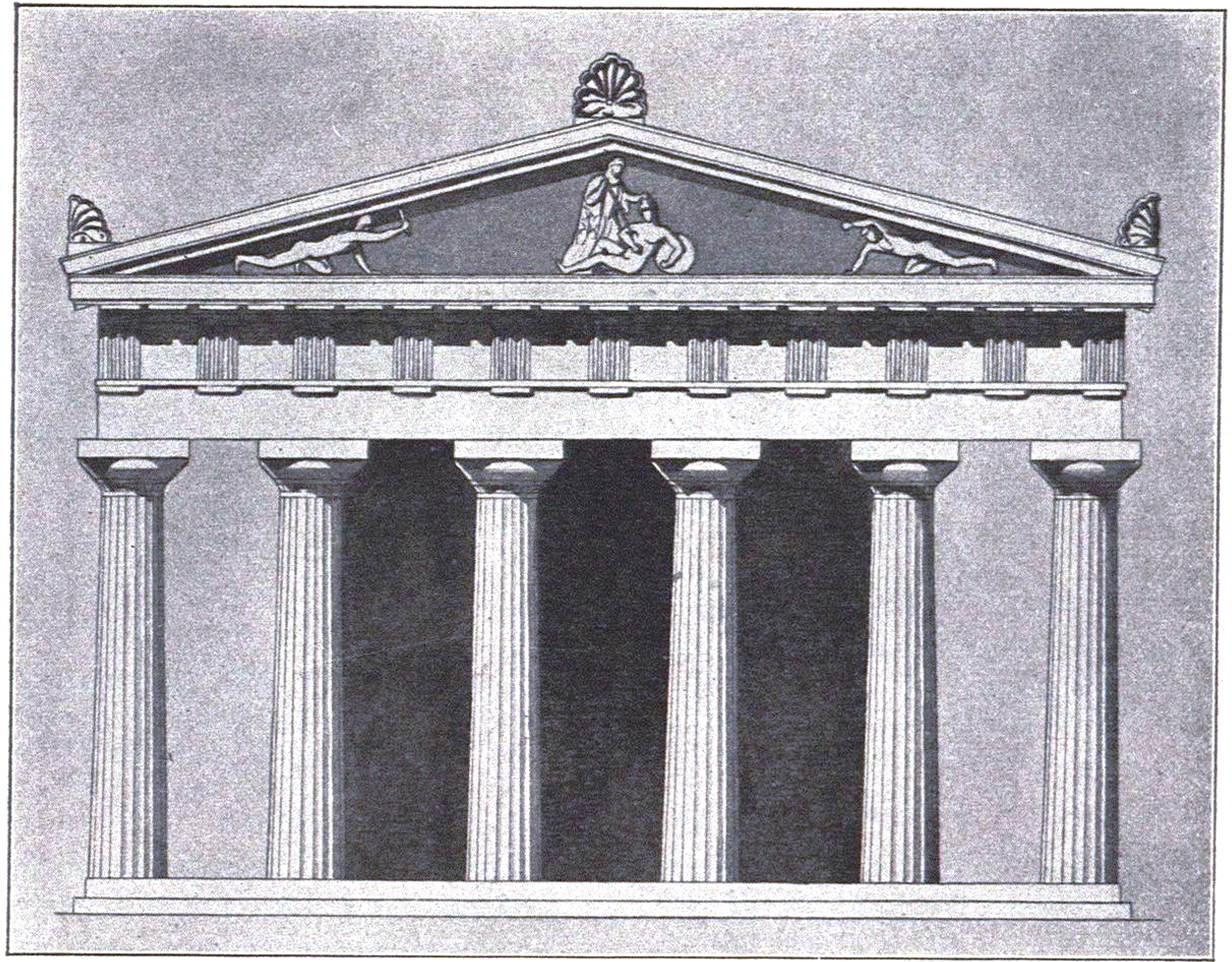
Elevation view of a proposed reconstruction of the Old Temple of Athena. Built around 525 BC, it stood between the Parthenon and the Erechtheum. Fragments of the sculptures in its pediments are in the Acropolis Museum.

Little is known about the architectural appearance of the Acropolis before the Archaic era. During the 7th and the 6th centuries BC, the site was controlled by Kylon during the failed Kylonian revolt, and twice by Peisistratos; each of these was an attempt directed at seizing political power by coups d'état. Apart from the Hekatompedon mentioned later, Peisistratos also built an entry gate or propylaea. Nevertheless, it seems that a nine-gate wall, the Enneapylon, had been built around the acropolis hill and incorporated the biggest water spring, the Clepsydra, at the northwestern foot.

A temple to Athena Polias, the tutelary deity of the city, was erected between 570 and 550 BC. This Doric limestone building, from which many relics survive, is referred to as the Hekatompedon (Greek for "hundred–footed"), Ur-Parthenon (German for "original Parthenon" or "primitive Parthenon"), H–Architecture or Bluebeard temple, after the pedimental three-bodied man-serpent sculpture, whose beards were painted dark blue. Whether this temple replaced an older one or just a sacred precinct or altar is not known. Probably, the Hekatompedon was built where the Parthenon now stands.

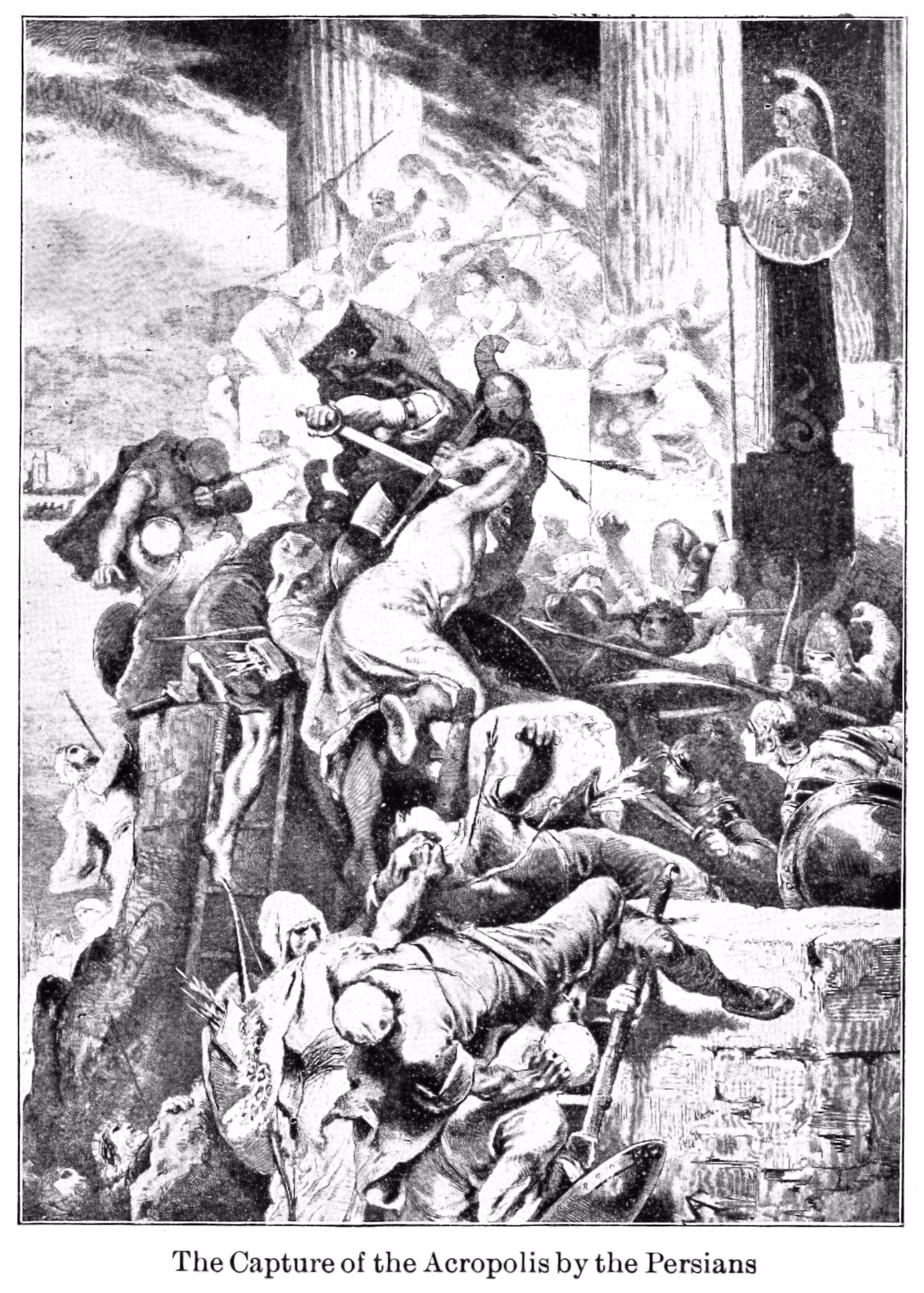
Destruction of the Acropolis by the armies of Xerxes I, during the Second Persian invasion of Greece, 480–479 BC

Between 529 and 520 BC yet another temple was built by the Pisistratids, the Old Temple of Athena, usually referred to as the Arkhaios Neōs (ἀρχαῖος νεώς, "ancient temple"). This temple of Athena Polias was built upon the Dörpfeld foundations, between the Erechtheion and the still-standing Parthenon. The Arkhaios Neōs was destroyed as part of the Achaemenid destruction of Athens during the Second Persian invasion of Greece during 480–479 BC; however, the temple was probably reconstructed during 454 BC, since the treasury of the Delian League was transferred in its opisthodomos. The temple may have been burnt down during 406/405 BC as Xenophon mentions that the old temple of Athena was set afire. Pausanias does not mention it in his 2nd century AD Description of Greece.

Around 500 BC the Hekatompedon was dismantled to make place for a new grander building, the Older Parthenon (often referred to as the Pre-Parthenon or Early Parthenon). For this reason, Athenians decided to stop the construction of the Olympieion temple which was connoted with the tyrant Peisistratos and his sons, and, instead, used the Piraeus limestone destined for the Olympieion to build the Older Parthenon. To accommodate the new temple, the south part of the summit was cleared, made level by adding some 8,000 two-ton blocks of limestone, a foundation 11 m (36 ft) deep at some points, and the rest was filled with soil kept in place by the retaining wall. However, after the victorious Battle of Marathon in 490 BC, the plan was revised and marble was used instead. The limestone phase of the building is referred to as Pre-Parthenon I and the marble phase as Pre-Parthenon II. In 485 BC, construction stalled to save resources as Xerxes became king of Persia, and war seemed imminent.

The Older Parthenon was still under construction when the Persians invaded and sacked the city in 480 BC. The building was burned and looted, along with the Ancient Temple and practically everything else on the rock. After the Persian crisis had subsided, the Athenians incorporated many architectural parts of the unfinished temple (unfluted column drums, triglyphs, metopes, etc.) into the newly built northern curtain wall of the Acropolis, where they served as a prominent "war memorial" and can still be seen today. The devastated site was cleared of debris. Statuary, cult objects, religious offerings, and unsalvageable architectural members were buried ceremoniously in several deeply dug pits on the hill, serving conveniently as a fill for the artificial plateau created around the Classical Parthenon. This "Persian debris" was the richest archaeological deposit excavated on the Acropolis by 1890.

=== The Periclean building program ===
After winning at Eurymedon during 468 BC, Cimon and Themistocles ordered the reconstruction of the southern and northern walls of the Acropolis. Most of the major temples, including the Parthenon, were rebuilt by order of Pericles during the so-called Golden Age of Athens (460–430 BC). Phidias, an Athenian sculptor, and Ictinus and Callicrates, two famous architects, were responsible for the reconstruction.

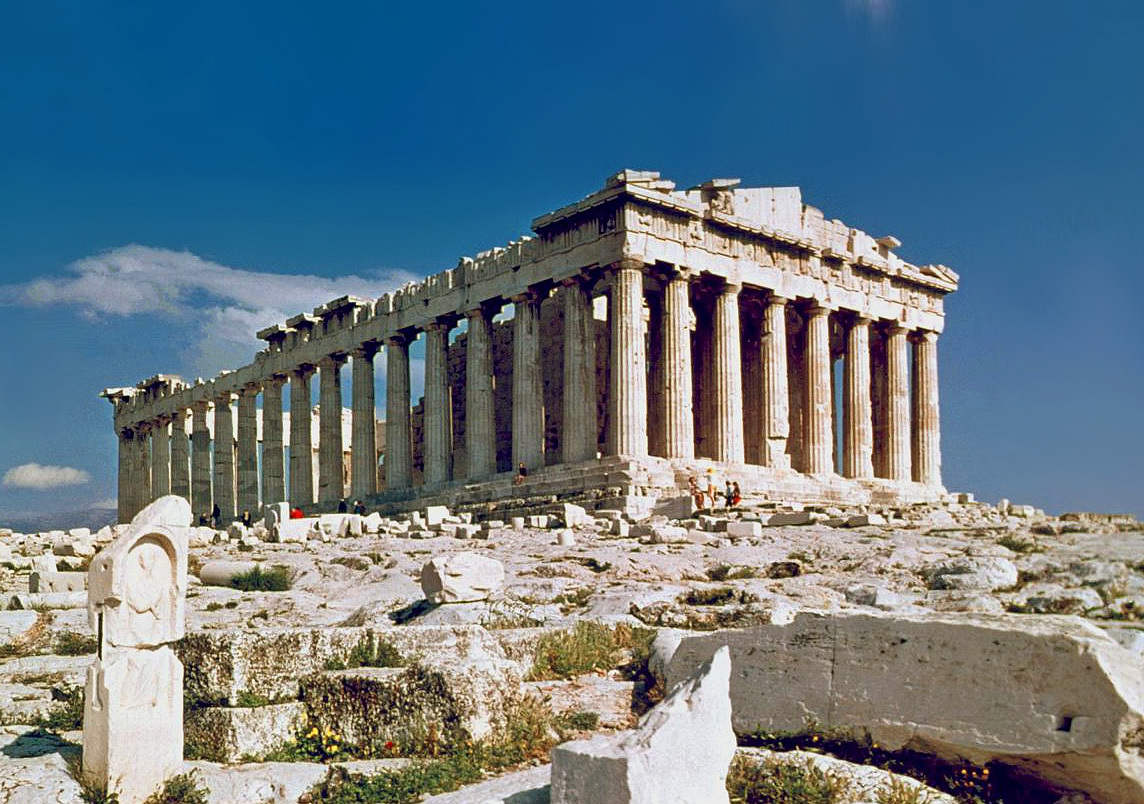
The Parthenon, as seen from the north-west in 1978

During 437 BC, Mnesicles started building the Propylaea, a monumental gate at the western end of the Acropolis with Doric columns of Pentelic marble, built partly upon the old Propylaea of Peisistratos. These colonnades were almost finished during 432 BC and had two wings, the northern one decorated with paintings by Polygnotus. About the same time, south of the Propylaea, building started on the small Ionic Temple of Athena Nike in Pentelic marble with tetrastyle porches, preserving the essentials of Greek temple design. After an interruption caused by the Peloponnesian War, the temple was finished during the time of Nicias' peace, between 421 BC and 409 BC.

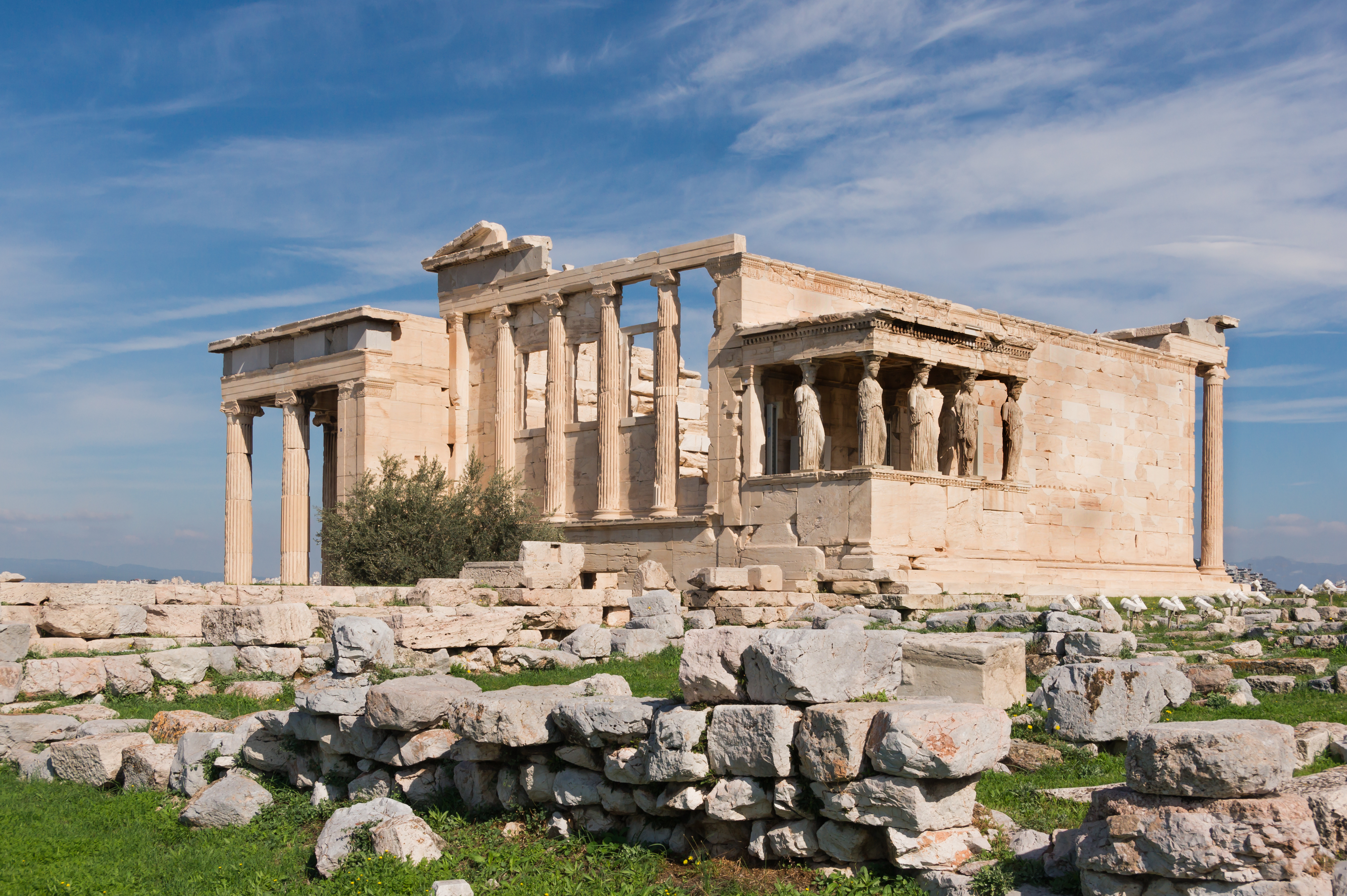
The Erechtheion, viewed from the south-west, looking across the remains of the Old Temple in 2015

Construction of the elegant temple of Erechtheion in Pentelic marble (421–406 BC) was by a complex plan which took account of the extremely uneven ground and the need to circumvent several shrines in the area. The entrance, facing east, is lined with six Ionic columns. Unusually, the temple has two porches, one on the northwest corner borne by Ionic columns, the other, to the southwest, supported by huge female figures or caryatids. The eastern part of the temple was dedicated to Athena Polias, while the western part, serving the cult of the archaic king Poseidon-Erechtheus, housed the altars of Hephaestus and Voutos, brother of Erechtheus. Little is known about the original plan of the interior, which was destroyed by fire during the first century BC and has been rebuilt several times.

During the same period, a combination of sacred precincts including the temples of Athena Polias, Poseidon, Erechtheus, Cecrops, Herse, Pandrosos and Aglauros, with its Kore Porch (Porch of the Maidens) or Caryatids' Balcony was begun. Between the temple of Athena Nike and the Parthenon, there was the Sanctuary of Artemis Brauronia (or the Brauroneion), the goddess represented as a bear and worshipped in the deme of Brauron. According to Pausanias, a wooden statue or xoanon of the goddess and a statue of Artemis made by Praxiteles during the 4th century BC were both in the sanctuary.

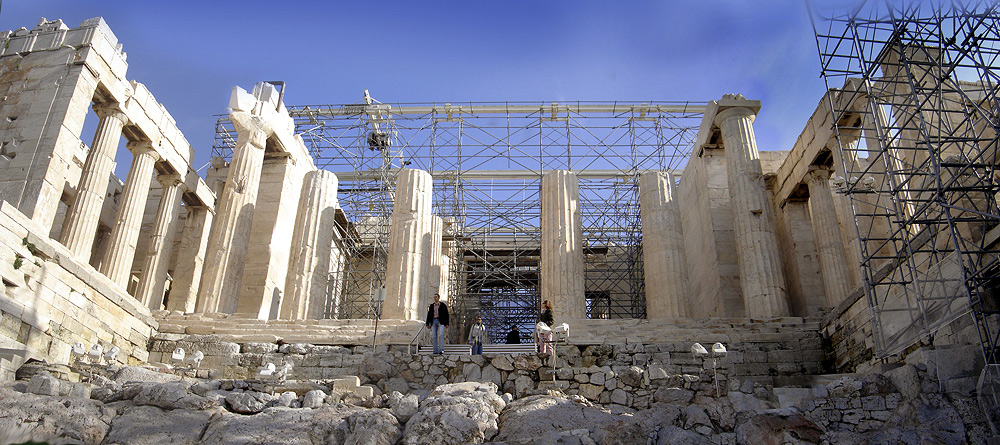
The Propylaea in 2005

Behind the Propylaea, Phidias' gigantic bronze statue of Athena Promachos ("Athena who fights in the front line"), built between 450 BC and 448 BC, dominated. The base was 1.50 m (4 ft 11 in) high, while the total height of the statue was 9 m (30 ft). The goddess held a lance, the gilt tip of which could be seen as a reflection by crews on ships rounding Cape Sounion, and a giant shield on the left side, decorated by Mys with images of the fight between the Centaurs and the Lapiths. Other monuments that have left almost nothing visible to the present day are the Chalkotheke, the Pandroseion, Pandion's sanctuary, Athena's altar, Zeus Polieus's sanctuary and, from Roman times, the circular Temple of Roma and Augustus.

=== Hellenistic and Roman Period ===
3-D model of the Acropolis in 165 AD (click to rotate)

During the Hellenistic and Roman periods, many of the existing buildings in the area of the Acropolis were repaired to remedy damage from age and occasionally war. Monuments to foreign kings were erected, notably those of the Attalid kings of Pergamon Attalos II (in front of the NW corner of the Parthenon), and Eumenes II, in front of the Propylaea. These were rededicated during the early Roman Empire to Augustus or Claudius (uncertain) and Agrippa, respectively. Eumenes was also responsible for constructing a stoa on the south slope, similar to that of Attalos in the agora below.

During the Julio-Claudian period, the Temple of Roma and Augustus, a small, round edifice about 23 meters from the Parthenon, was to be the last significant ancient construction on the summit of the rock. Around the same time, on the north slope, in a cave next to the one dedicated to Pan since the Classical period, a sanctuary was founded where the archons dedicated to Apollo on assuming office. During 161 AD, on the south slope, the Roman Herodes Atticus built his grand amphitheater or odeon. It was destroyed by the invading Herulians a century later but was reconstructed during the 1950s.

During the 3rd century, under threat from a Herulian invasion, repairs were made to the Acropolis walls, and the Beulé Gate was constructed to restrict entrance in front of the Propylaea, thus returning the Acropolis to use as a fortress.

=== Byzantine, Latin, and Ottoman Period ===
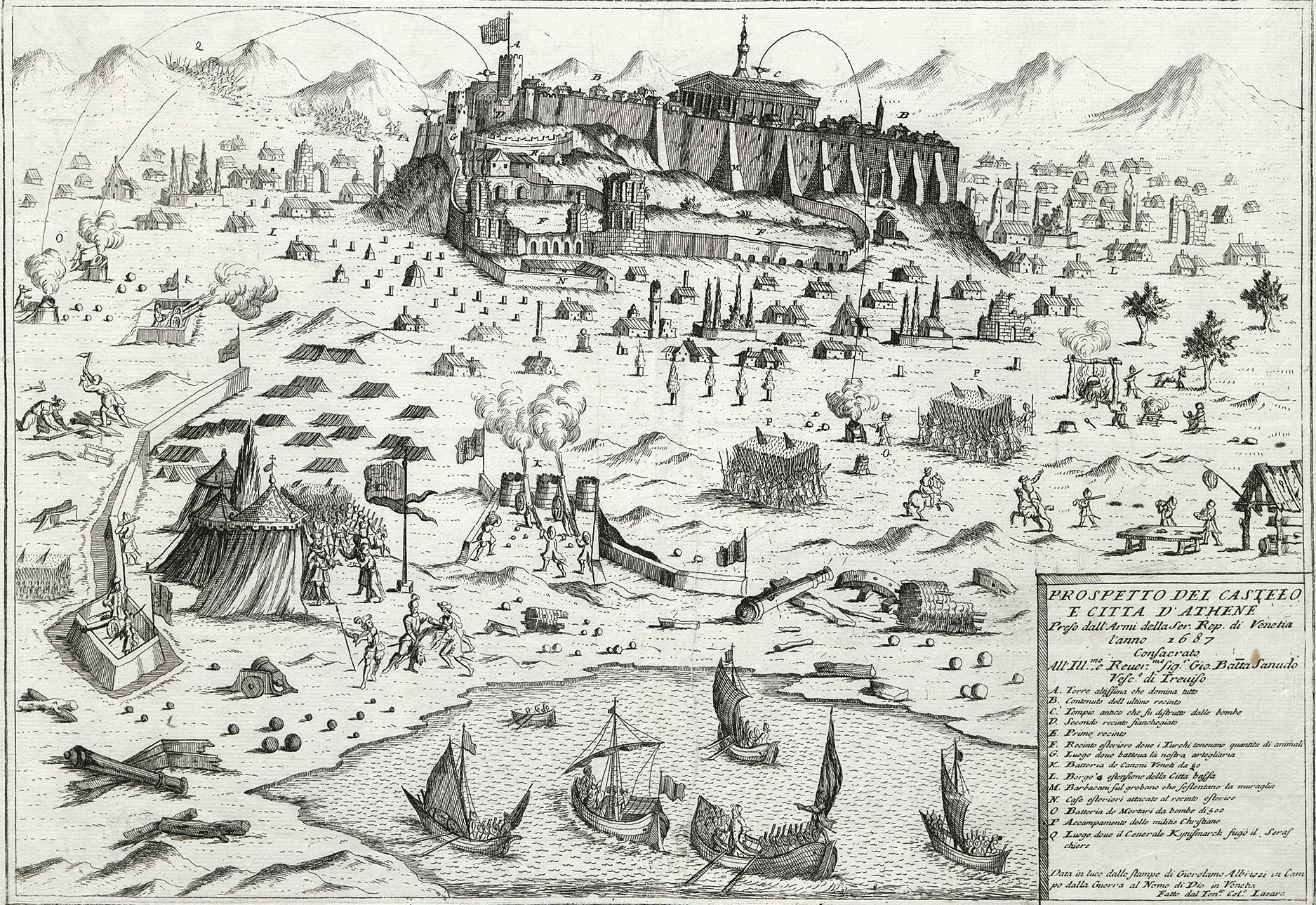
Depiction of the Venetian siege of the Acropolis of Athens during 1687.

During the Byzantine period, the Parthenon was used as a church dedicated to the Virgin Mary. During the Latin Duchy of Athens, the Acropolis functioned as the city's administrative center, with the Parthenon as its cathedral, and the Propylaea as part of the ducal palace. A large tower was added, the Frankopyrgos (Frankish Tower), demolished during the 19th century.

After the Ottoman conquest of Greece, the Propylaea were used as the garrison headquarters of the Turkish army and the Erechtheum was turned into the governor's private harem. The buildings of the Acropolis suffered significant damage during the 1687 siege by the Venetians in the Morean War. The Parthenon, which was being used as a gunpowder magazine, was hit by artillery and damaged severely.

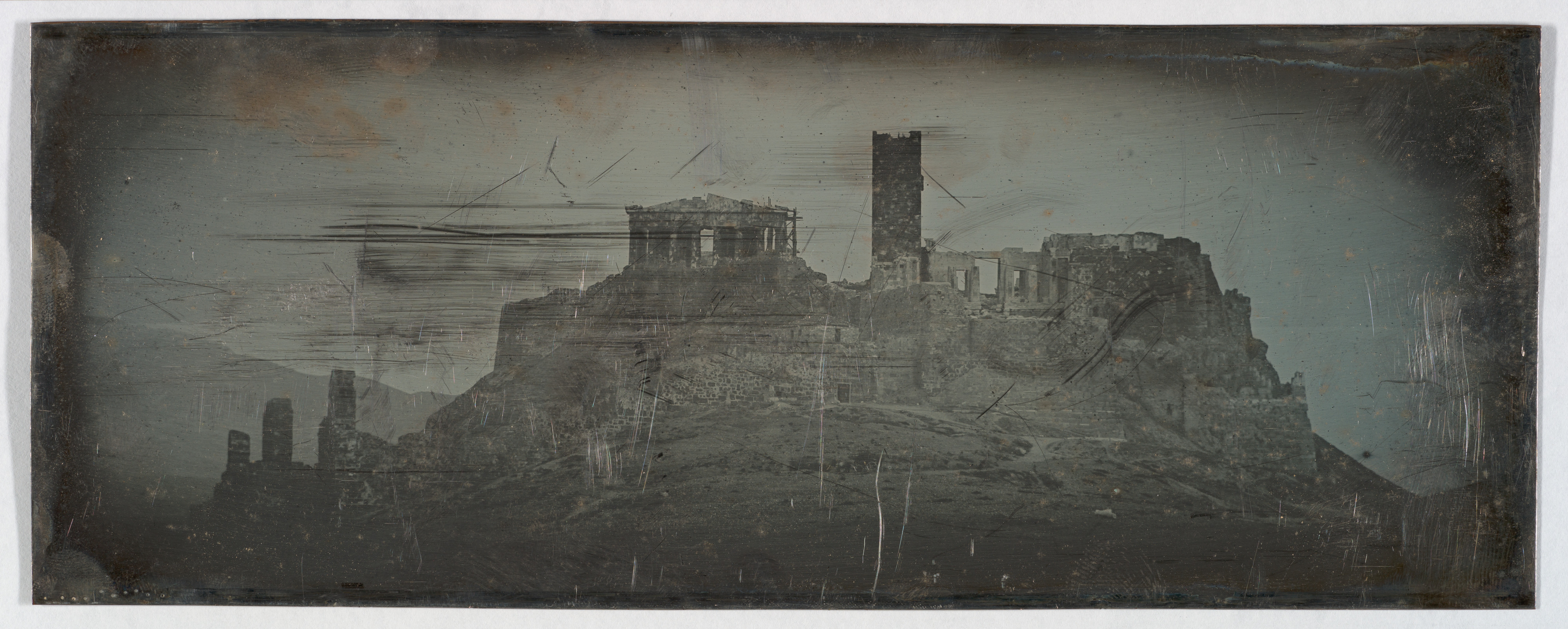
1842 daguerreotype by Joseph-Philibert Girault de Prangey (earliest known photo of the site)

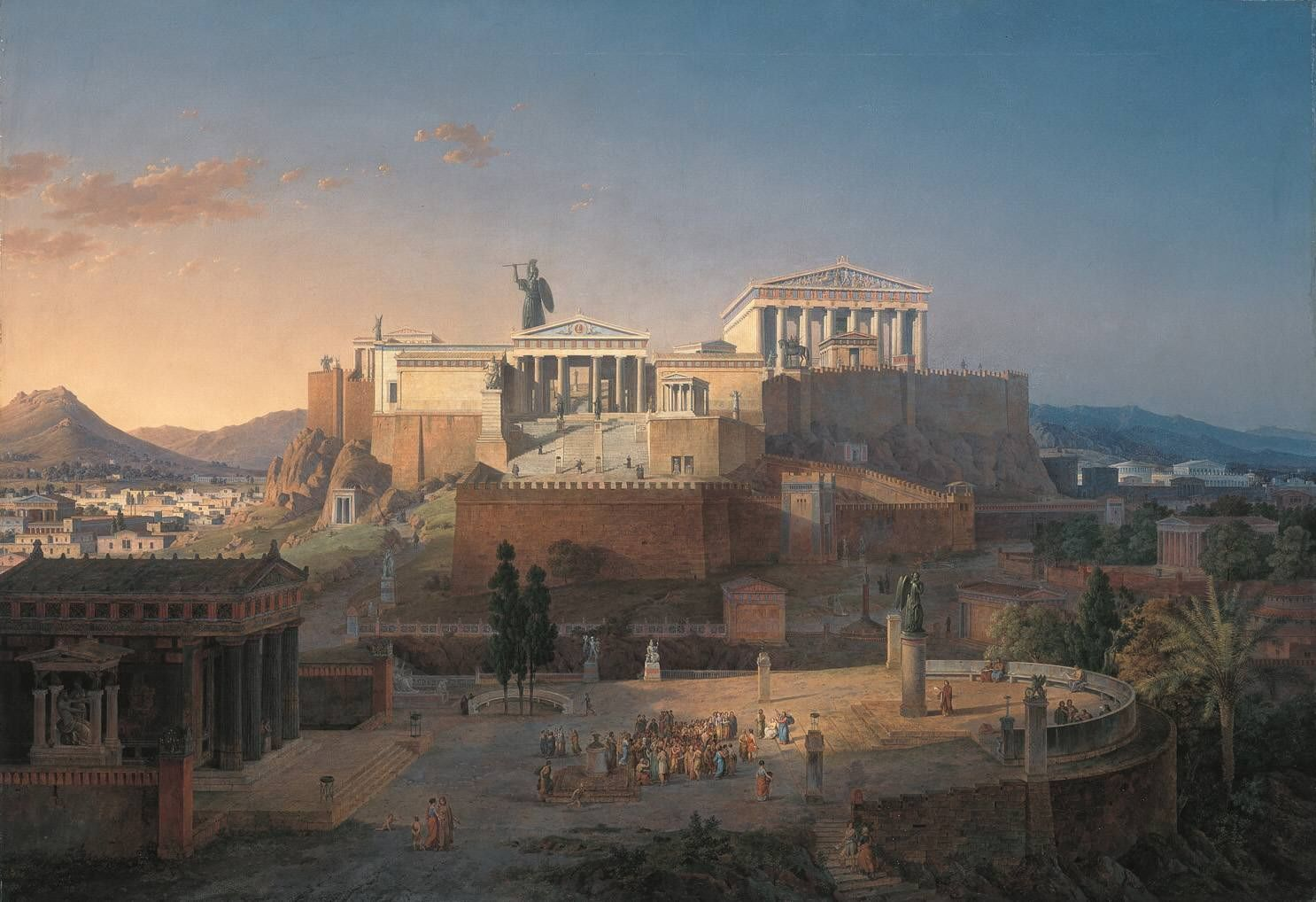
Idealized reconstruction of the Acropolis and Areios Pagos in Athens, Leo von Klenze, 1846.

During subsequent years, the Acropolis was a site of bustling human activity with many Byzantine, Frankish, and Ottoman structures.

The Acropolis was besieged thrice during the Greek War of Independence—two sieges from the Greeks in 1821–1822 and one from the Ottomans in 1826–1827. A new bulwark named after Odysseas Androutsos was built by the Greeks between 1822 and 1825 to protect the recently rediscovered Klepsydra spring, which became the sole fresh water supply of the fortress.

=== Independent Greece ===
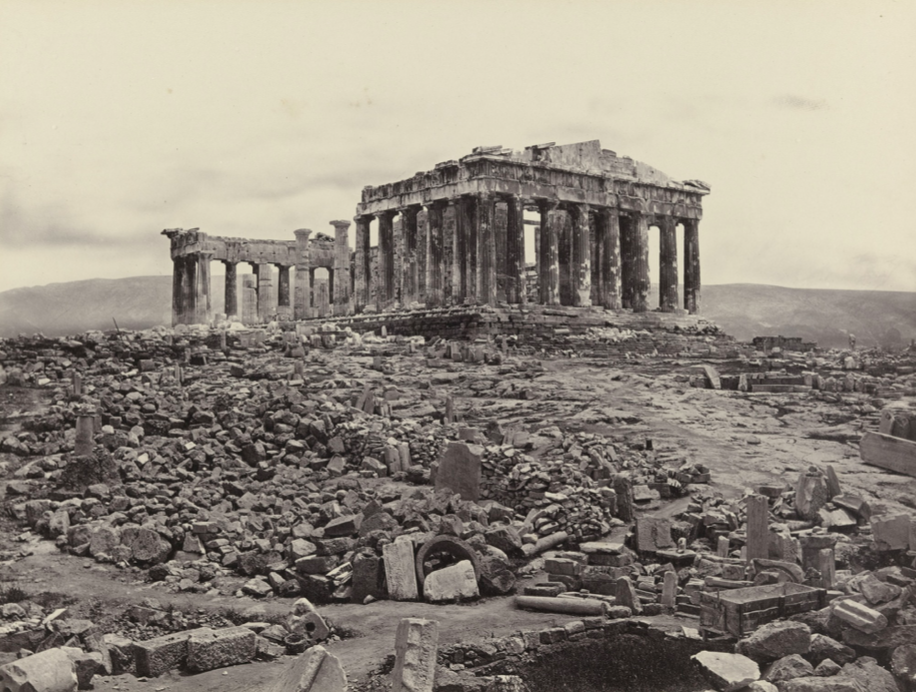
The Acropolis (photo using albumen silver print) by 19th century photographer Francis Frith

After independence, most features that dated from the Byzantine, Frankish, and Ottoman periods were cleared from the site in an attempt to restore the monument to its original form, "cleansed" of all later additions. The Parthenon mosque was demolished in 1843, and the Frankish Tower in 1875. German Neoclassicist architect Leo von Klenze was responsible for the restoration of the Acropolis in the 19th century, according to German historian Wolf Seidl, as described in his book Bavarians in Greece.

Some antiquities from the Acropolis were exhibited in the old Acropolis Museum, which was built in the second half of the 19th century.

At the beginning of the Axis occupation of Greece in 1941, German soldiers raised the Nazi German War Flag over the Acropolis. It would be taken down by Manolis Glezos and Apostolos Santas in one of the first acts of resistance. In 1944 Greek Prime Minister Georgios Papandreou arrived on the Acropolis to celebrate liberation from the Nazis.

== Archaeological remains ==
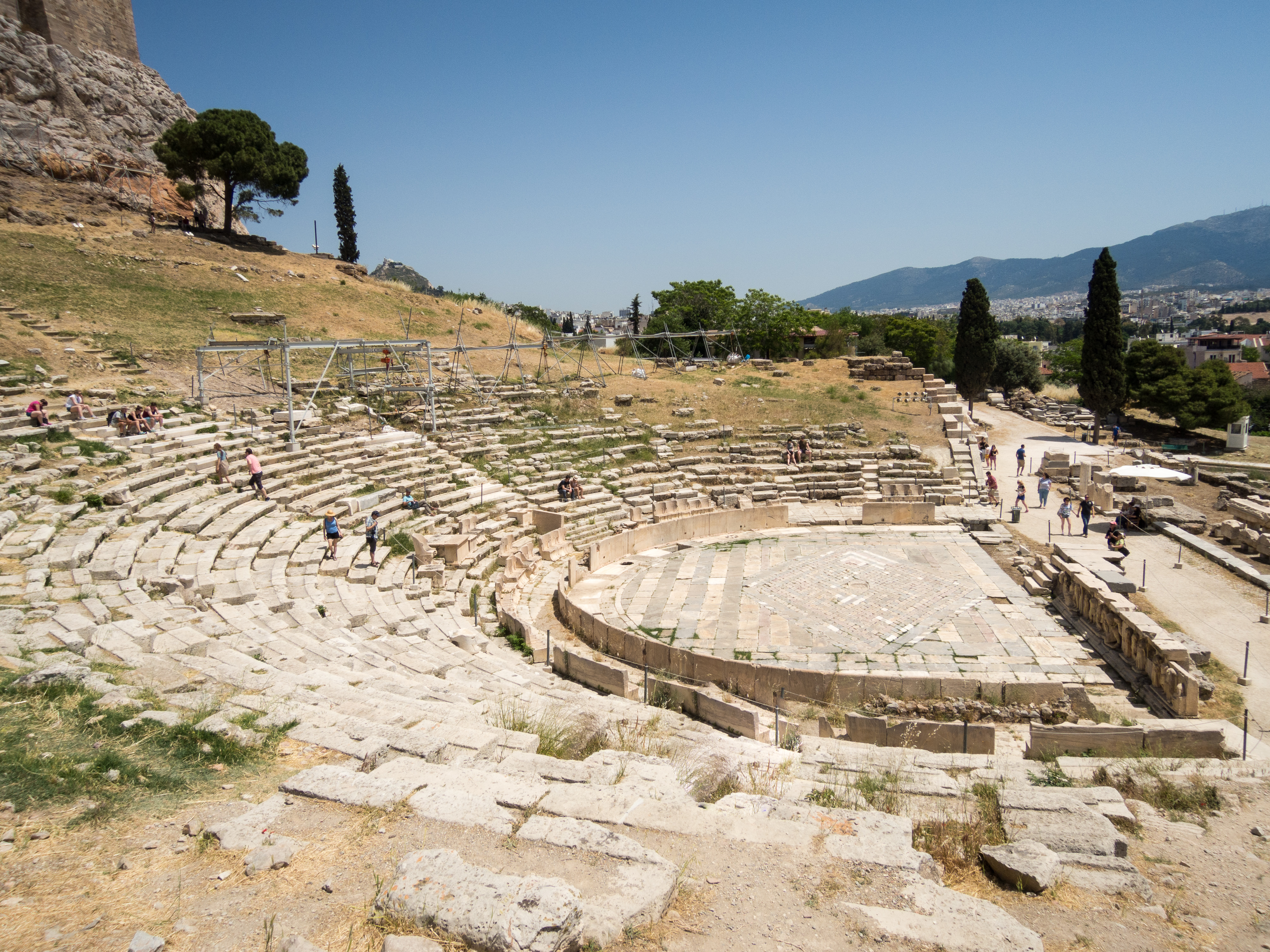
Remains of the Theatre of Dionysus as of 2007. View from the west.

The entrance to the Acropolis was a monumental gateway termed the Propylaea. To the south of the entrance is the tiny Temple of Athena Nike. At the centre of the Acropolis is the Parthenon or Temple of Athena Parthenos (Athena the Virgin). East of the entrance and north of the Parthenon is the temple known as the Erechtheum. South of the platform that forms the top of the Acropolis there are also the remains of the ancient, though often remodelled, Theatre of Dionysus. A few hundred metres away, there is the now partially reconstructed Odeon of Herodes Atticus.

Many of the valuable ancient artifacts are situated in the Acropolis Museum, which resides on the southern slope of the same rock, 280 metres from the Parthenon.

=== Site plan ===
Site plan of the Acropolis at Athens showing the major archaeological remains.

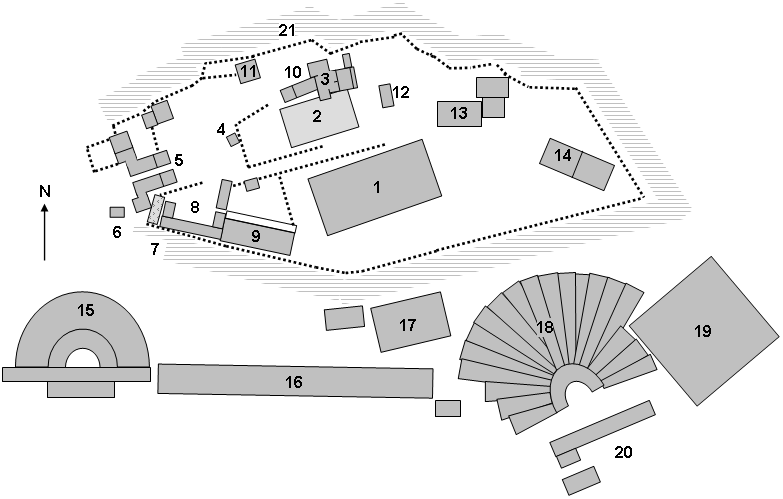

1. Parthenon
2. Old Temple of Athena
3. Erechtheum
4. Statue of Athena Promachos
5. Propylaea
6. Temple of Athena Nike
7. Eleusinion
8. Sanctuary of Artemis Brauronia or Brauroneion
9. Chalkotheke
10. Pandroseion
11. Arrephorion
12. Altar of Athena
13. Sanctuary of Zeus Polieus
14. Sanctuary of Pandion
15. Odeon of Herodes Atticus
16. Stoa of Eumenes
17. Sanctuary of Asclepius or Asclepieion
18. Theatre of Dionysus Eleuthereus
19. Odeon of Pericles
20. Temenos of Dionysus Eleuthereus
21. Mycenaean fountain

== The Acropolis Restoration Project ==
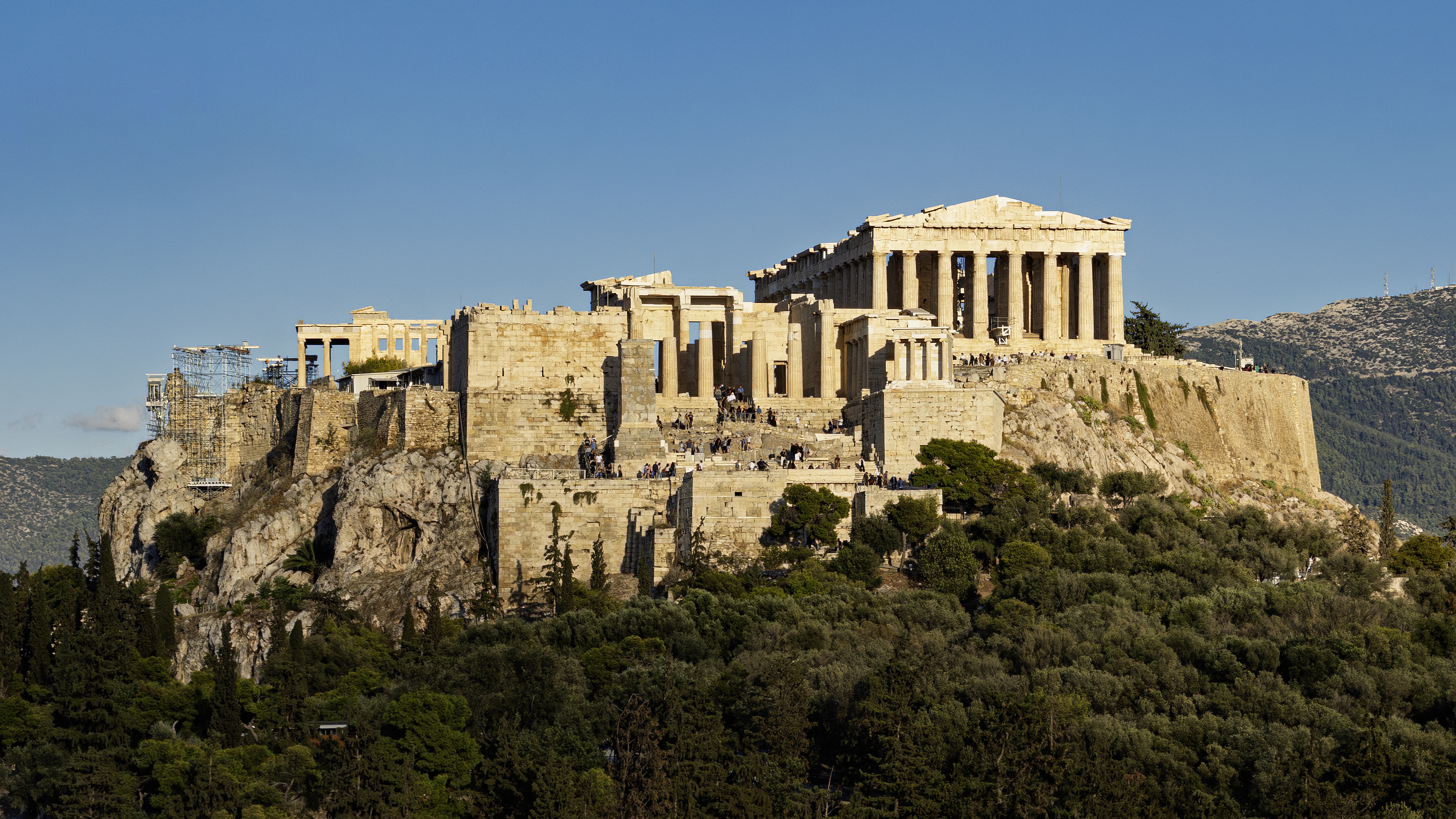
The Acropolis of Athens as seen from the Pnyx in October 2025 with the scaffolding on the west façade of the Parthenon removed after 15 years.

The Acropolis Restoration Project began in 1975 to reverse the decay of centuries of attrition, pollution, destruction from military actions, and misguided past restorations. The project included the collection and identification of all stone fragments, even small ones, from the Acropolis and its slopes, and the attempt was made to restore as much as possible using reassembled original material (anastylosis), with new marble from Mount Pentelicus used sparingly. All restoration was made using titanium dowels and is designed to be completely reversible, in case future experts decide to change things. A combination of cutting-edge modern technology and extensive research and reinvention of ancient techniques were used.

The Parthenon colonnades, largely destroyed by Venetian bombardment during the 17th century, were restored, with many wrongly assembled columns now properly placed. The roof and floor of the Propylaea were partly restored, with sections of the roof made of new marble and decorated with blue and gold inserts, as in the original. Restoration of the Temple of Athena Nike was completed in 2010.

A total of 2,675 tons of architectural members were restored, with 686 stones reassembled from fragments of the originals, 905 patched with new marble, and 186 parts made entirely of new marble. A total of 530 cubic meters of new Pentelic marble were used.

In 2021, the addition of new reinforced concrete paths to the site to improve accessibility caused controversy among archaeologists.

== Cultural significance ==
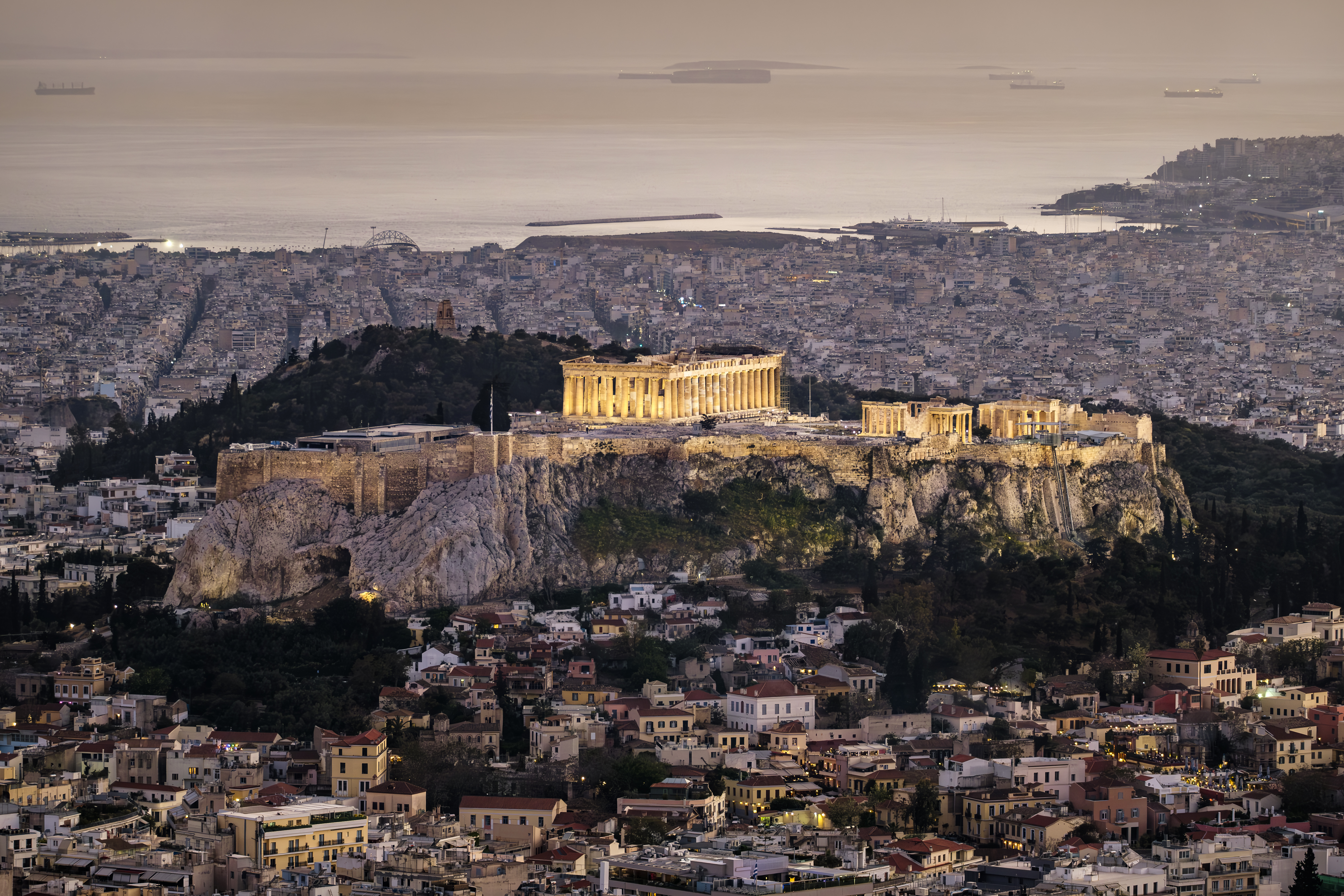
View of the Acropolis at dusk from Mount Lycabettus in 2023

Every four years, the Athenians had a festival called the Great Panathenaea that rivaled the Olympic Games in popularity. During the festival, a procession (believed to be depicted on the Parthenon frieze) traveled through the city via the Panathenaic Way and culminated on the Acropolis. There, a new robe of woven wool (peplos) was placed on either the statue of Athena Polias in the Erechtheum (during the annual Lesser Panathenaea) or the statue of Athena Parthenos in the Parthenon (during the Great Panathenaea, held every four years).

Within the later tradition of Western civilization and Classical revival, the Acropolis, from at least the mid-18th century on, has often been invoked as a critical symbol of the Greek legacy and of the glories of Classical Greece.

Most of the artifacts from the temple are housed today in the Acropolis Museum at the foot of the ancient rock.

== Geology ==
The Acropolis is a klippe consisting of two lithostratigraphic units: the Athens schist and the overlying Acropolis limestone. The Athens schist is a soft reddish rock dating from the late Cretaceous period. The original sediments were deposited in a river delta approximately 72 million years ago. The Acropolis limestone dates from the late Jurassic period, predating the underlying Athens schist by about 30 million years. The Acropolis limestone was thrust over the Athens schist by compressional tectonic forces, forming a nappe or overthrust sheet. Erosion of the limestone nappe led to the eventual detachment of the Acropolis, forming the present-day feature. Where the Athens schist and the limestone meet there are springs and karstic caves.

The limestone that the Acropolis is built upon is unstable because of the erosion and tectonic shifts that the region is prone to. This instability may cause rock slides that cause damage to the historic site. Various measures have been implemented to protect the site, including retaining walls, drainage systems, and rock bolts. These measures work to counter the natural processes that threaten the historic site.

Many of the hills in the Athens region were formed by the erosion of the same nappe as the Acropolis. These include the hills of Lykabettos, Areopagus, and Mouseion.

The marble used for the buildings of the Acropolis was sourced from the quarries of Mount Pentelicus, a mountain to the northeast of the city.

== See also ==
- Landscaping of the Acropolis of Athens
