= Arrephorion =

Building conjectured to have been on the Acropolis of Athens

Coordinates: 37°58′20″N 23°43′33″E

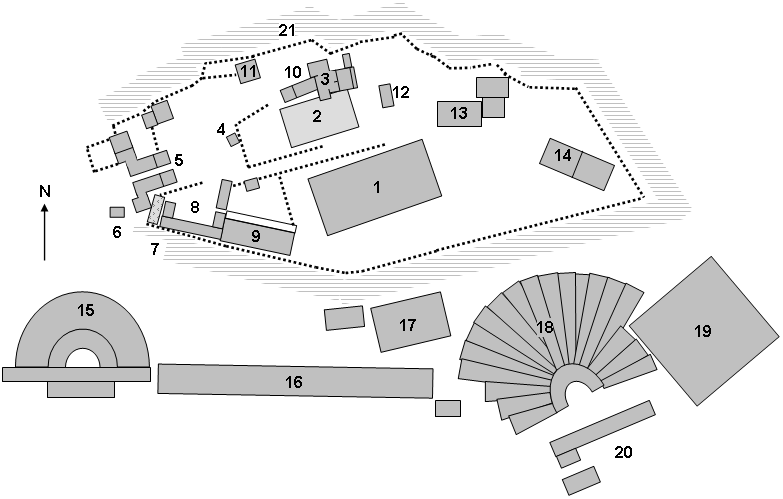
Site plan of the Acropolis at Athens - the Arrephorion is number 11.

The Arrephorion or House of the Arrephoroi is a building conjectured to have been on the Acropolis of Athens based on a passage in Pausanias. The discovery of the foundations of a substantial building on the north-west edge of the Acropolis has led to the identification of this structure with the Arrephorion.

Pausanias reports that:

I was much amazed at something which is not generally known, and so I will describe the circumstances. Two maidens dwell not far from the temple of Athena Polias, called by the Athenians Bearers of the Sacred Offerings. For a time they live with the goddess, but when the festival comes round they perform at night the following rites. Having placed on their heads what the priestess of Athena gives them to carry—neither she who gives nor they who carry have any knowledge what it is—the maidens descend by the natural underground passage that goes across the adjacent precincts, within the city, of Aphrodite in the Gardens. They leave down below what they carry and receive something else which they bring back covered up. These maidens they henceforth let go free, and take up to the Acropolis others in their place.

Additionally, Plutarch remarks on the existence of a ballcourt adjacent to the house. The physical remains fit what we know of the House of the Arrephoroi but the evidence is still circumstantial that this was in fact the residence of the Arrephoroi.

The dimensions of the building are 12.2 m (40 ft) square, and it was erected on a foundation of limestone blocks. It was divided into a south-facing portico of 4.4 m (14 ft) deep and a single rectangular room of approximately 8 by 12 m (26 by 39 ft). The terrace immediately around the building is an artificial one created by infill, which along with the foundation is dated to the last half of the 5th century or contemporary with the Erechtheion.

The reconstruction of the architecture is controversial. While Dörpfeld assumed a south-facing front with two columns in antis - a conjecture that has recently been taken up again - four columns between the antae were later reconstructed. However, since no other four-column antae structures are known, a reconstruction with a six-column prostyle porch was recently proposed. Because of the wide foundations, it can be assumed that there was a step substructure, a crepidoma, on which the actual building stood. Only a gable with a corresponding roof can have risen above the six-columned, prostyle portico. Older reconstructions with a hipped, pyramidal roof would therefore have to be discarded. The order of the columns in the building is unclear. An Ionic order is to be considered, although most available reconstructions assume a Doric order.

== Bibliography ==
- Jeppesen, Kristian (1987). The Theory of the Alternative Erechtheion: Premises, Definition and Implications. Aarhus University Press.
- Hurwit, Jeffrey M. (1999). The Athenian Acropolis: History, Mythology, and Archaeology from the Neolithic Era to the Present. Cambridge.
- Kadletz, E. "Pausanias 1.27.3 and the route of the Arrephoroi". American Journal of Archaeology. 86: 445–6. doi:10.2307/504434. JSTOR 504434. S2CID 192949346.
- Stevens, Gorham Phillips (1936). "The Periclean Entrance Court of the Acropolis of Athens". Hesperia. 5 (4): 443–520. doi:10.2307/146607. JSTOR 146607.
