= Pandroseion =

Ancient sanctuary in Greece

Coordinates: 37.9719°N 23.7261°E

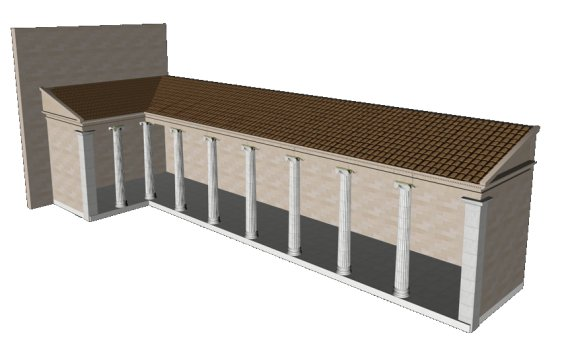
Reconstruction of the Pandroseion as it would have looked around 421 BC

The Pandroseion (pronounced: panδrosion, Greek: Πανδρόσειον) was a sanctuary dedicated to Pandrosus, one of the daughters of Cecrops I, the first king of Attica Greece, located on the Acropolis of Athens. It occupied the space adjacent to the Erechtheum and the old Temple of Athena Polias.

The sanctuary was a walled trapezoidal courtyard containing the altar of Zeus Herkeios (protector of the hearth, of the courtyard) under the sacred Olive Tree planted by Athena. At the west was an entrance stoa from the Propylea. In the northeast corner was an elaborate entrance into the north porch and the entire Etrechtheion complex. At the east, there was also a small opening through which the Thalassa of Poseidon could be viewed. The south-east corner gave access to what some thought was the tomb of Cecrops. The sanctuary also contained the sacred olive tree which was presented by Athena to the city of Athens, after her victory over Poseidon in the contest for the land of Attica.
