= Sanctuary of Zeus Polieus =

Ancient sanctuary in the Acropolis of Athens

Coordinates: 37.9718°N 23.7273°E

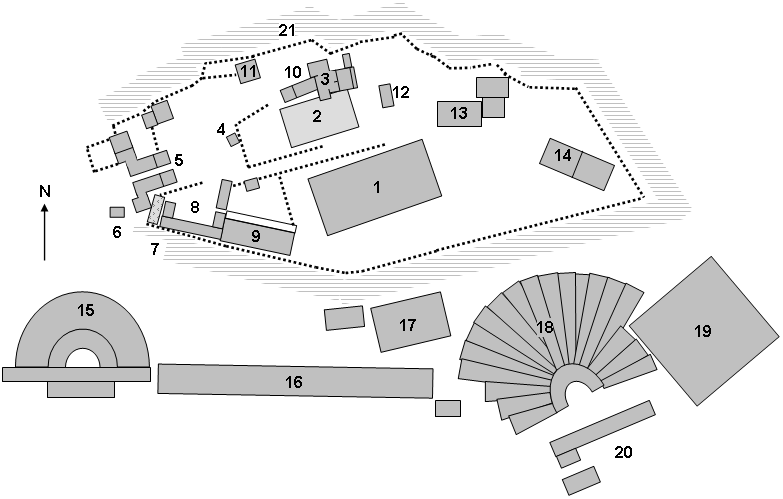
Site plan of the Acropolis at Athens: number 13 is the sanctuary

The Sanctuary of Zeus Polieus was a walled open-air sanctuary dedicated to Zeus Polieus (city protector) around 500 BC on the Acropolis of Athens, sited to the Erechtheion's east. Although no foundations have been uncovered, its trapezoidal layout and numerous entrances are inferred from rock-cuttings on the Acropolis. The sanctuary's eastern section is believed to have accommodated the oxen used in the annual Bouphonia ceremony. The main entrance was adorned with a pediment.

Pausanias described the Homarium at Aegium in the 2nd century:

[On the Akropolis of Athens :] There are statues of Zeus, one made by Leokhares and one called Polieus (Of the City, the customary mode of sacrificing to whom I will give without adding the traditional reason thereof. Upon the altar of Zeus Polieus they place barley mixed with wheat and leave it unguarded. The ox, which they keep already prepared for sacrifice, goes to the altar and partakes of the grain. One of the priests they call the ox-slayer, who kills the ox and then, casting aside the axe here according to the ritual runs away. The others bring the axe to trial, as though they know not the man who did the deed.

== Sources ==
- http://www.ancient-greece.org/architecture/zeus-polieus.html
