= Mnesikles =

Ancient Athenian architect

Mnesikles (Ancient Greek: Μνησικλῆς; Latin transliteration: Mnesicles) was an ancient Athenian architect active in the mid 5th century BC, the age of Pericles.

Plutarch (Pericles, 13) identifies him as architect of the Propylaea, the Periclean gateway to the Athenian Acropolis.
