= Kore 670 =

Archaic Greek sculpture

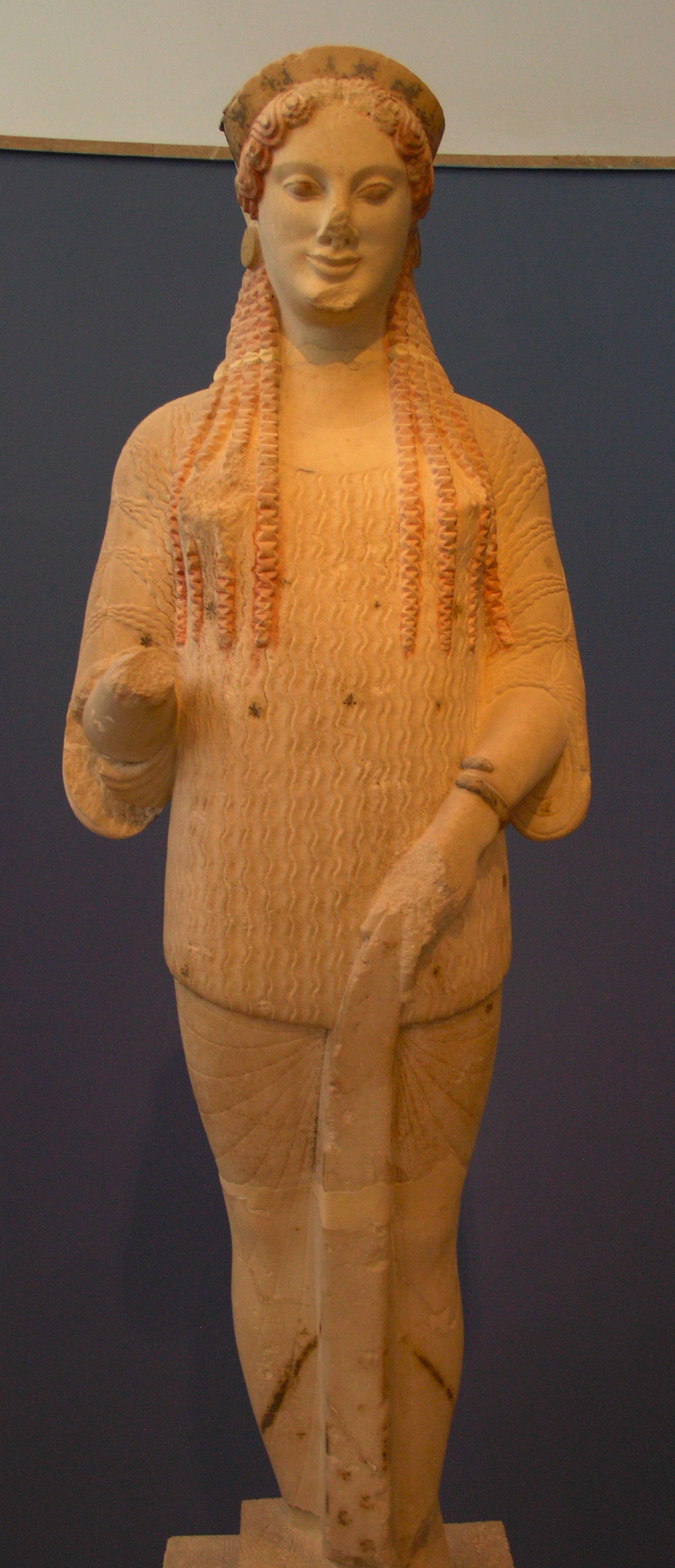
Kore 670 on display at the Acropolis Museum (2007)

Kore 670 is a Late Archaic Greek kore made of Parian marble, created in 520–510 BC, measuring 115 cm (3 ft, 9.28 inches).

It is among the Korai of the Acropolis of Athens, which serve as a votive function, as an offering to Athena. It is held by the Acropolis Museum in Athens, and displayed in the Archaic Acropolis Gallery. It is believed that she was carved by the sculptors Antenor or Endoios, who sculpted the Athena of the Gigantomachy pediment, which adorned the Old Temple of Athena.

== Discovery ==
Slightly under life-size and missing its hands and feet, it once stood on the Acropolis of Athens. In 480 BC, the Acropolis was destroyed during the Second Persian invasion of Greece by Xerxes I. Several statues, including this one, were then buried in the northern campus of the Acropolis after the battle, followed by the reconstruction of the temple by Athenian citizens.

In 1886, this statue along with the other korai, such as the Antenor Kore, the Euthydikos Kore, and the Peplos Kore, were discovered in excavations on the northwest side of the Erechtheion, in what is known as the Perserschutt (German for "Persian debris").

== Description ==
Each kore of the Acropolis wears a different outfit. Unlike the other korai, Kore 670 is dressed in a chiton, tied around the waist. The kore also wears a bracelet. Her hair is braided and she wears a stephane adorned with palmettes and lotuses, with metal ornaments which would have adorned the stephane.

Her left arm is down to her waist, grasping the lower part of the chiton, with right arm, hand missing, extended forth. Her expression retains an Archaic smile, but softer, with the outer corner of the lips cut into the face.

Compared to other Attic korai, she is slender, and her style matches that of Chios, an indication of cultural exchange, and artists executing commissions from different parts of Greece.

The kore is renowned for preserving its polychromy, maintaining some its original paint, primarily the reds, and some yellow. The sculpture would have originally been adorned with green and blue pigment.

== Exhibition abroad ==
From March 2022 to September 2022, Kore 670 was loaned to the Royal Ontario Museum to commemorate the 80th anniversary of Canada–Greece relations, which began in 1942 with the government-in-exile during the Axis occupation of Greece.

From May 2023 to January 8, 2024, the Kore was loaned to the Museum of Fine Arts, Boston and displayed in the Early Greek Art gallery.
