= Korai of the Acropolis of Athens =

Group of statues discovered in the Acropolis of Athens

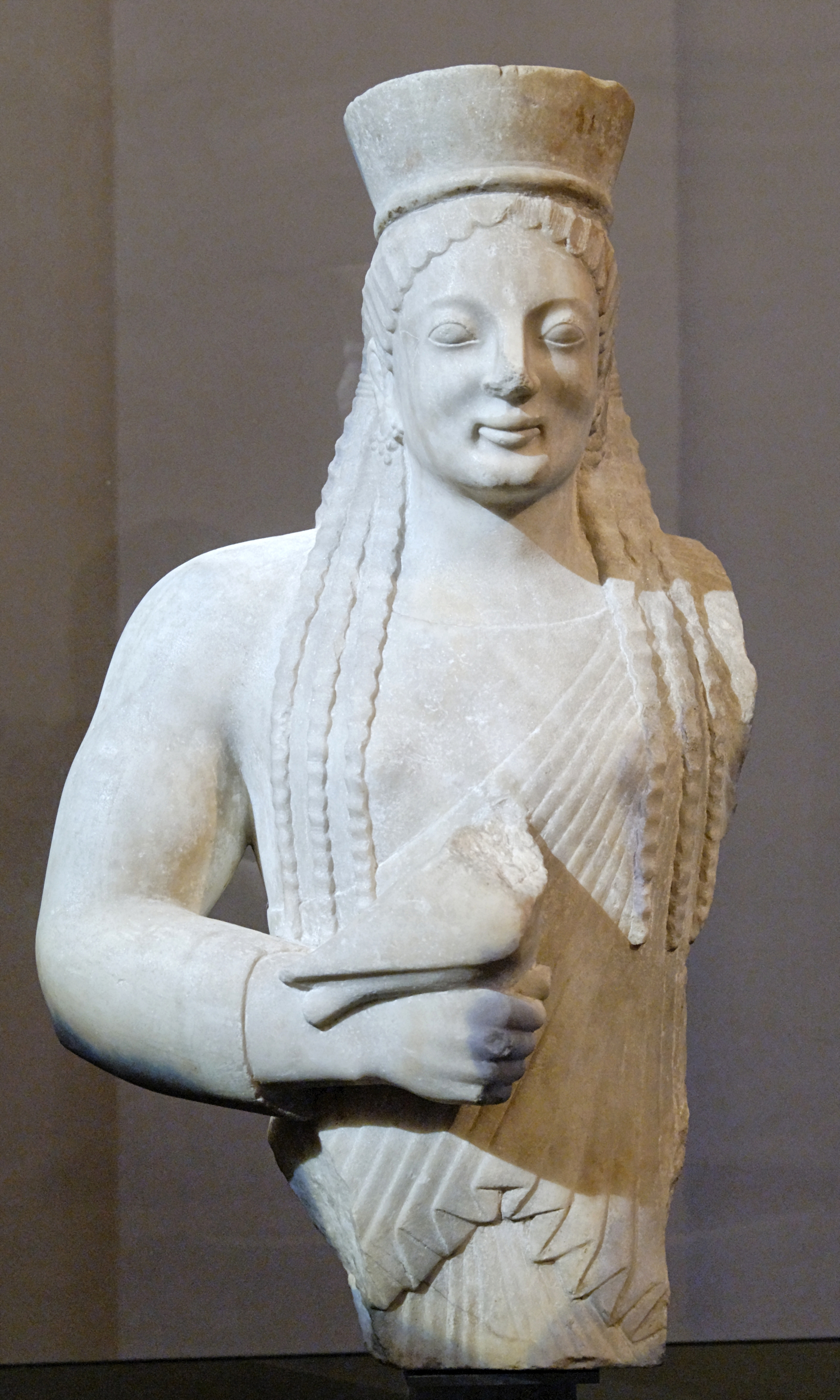
The Kore of Lyons in the Museum of Fine Arts of Lyon

The Korai of the Acropolis of Athens are a group of female statues (Korai), discovered in the Perserschutt of the Acropolis of Athens in the last quarter of the nineteenth century, all of the same typology and clear votive function. Through them it is possible to trace the stylistic evolution of Archaic Attic sculpture for almost a century, from 570 to 480 BC. This demonstrates in particular the beginning and development of Ionian influence on Athenian art of the second half of the 6th century BC. This was the period when Ionian elements first appear in the architectural works of the Peisistratids and close connections between Ionia and Athens developed. Towards the end of the 6th century BC this influence is seen to be overcome, or rather absorbed, and a new style is born, the so-called Severe style, with increasing Peloponnesian influence.

== Description ==
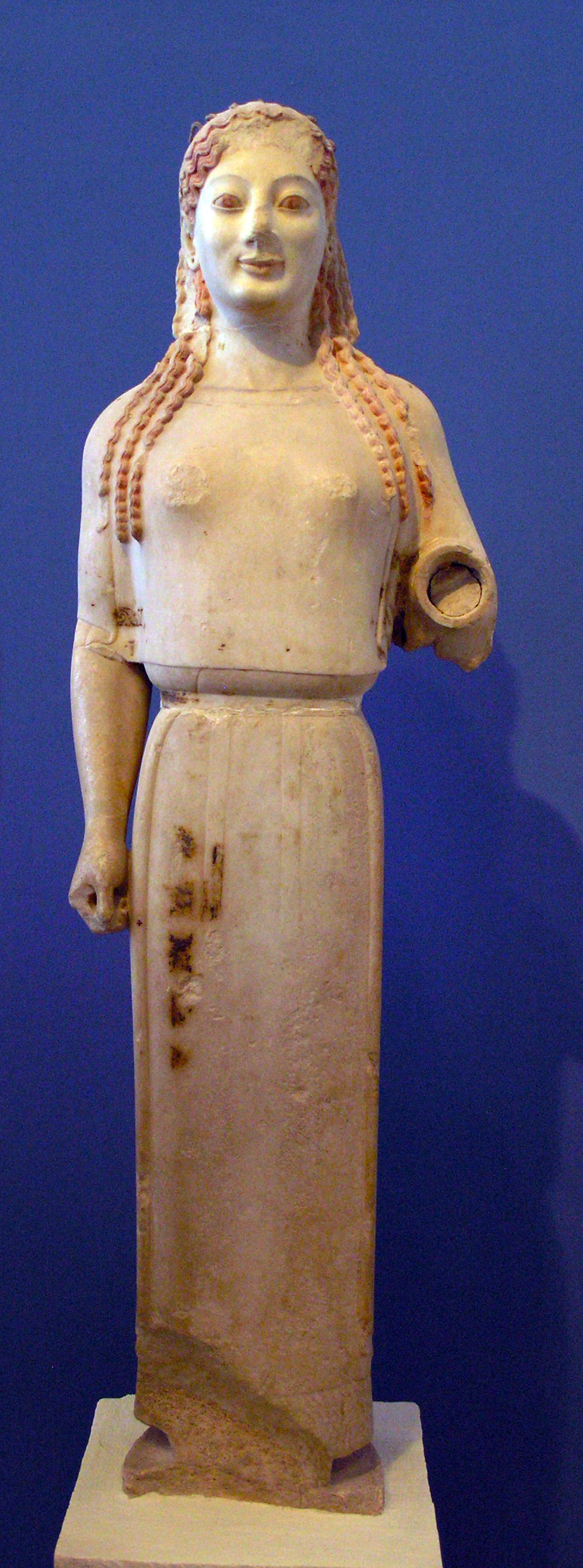
Peplos Kore, c. 530 BC

Among the most ancient korai found on the Athenian acropolis, are Acropolis 619 and Acropolis 677 which date from the first half of the 6th century and derive from Samos and Naxos respectively, while the Kore of Lyons, dating to the middle of the century, represents the first example of Ionian influence on Attic sculpture, as well as the first use of typical Ionian costume in Attica. In the same category is Acropolis 593.

The replacement of the Dorian costume with the Ionian one caused a change in the whole formal system. The hand that held out the offering is detached from the bust to extend forwards, while the arm at her side gathers her skirts, after the model seen in Ionian female figures, like the Group of Geneleos. The change was introduced some time before the Peplos Kore (Acropolis 679), around 10 or 15 years after the Kore of Lyons.

The juxtaposition of the Attic korai of the 530s BC with the Leda on the amphora of Exekias in the Museo Gregoriano Etrusco is common. This group includes the Peplos Kore and Acropolis 678, which however display entirely different temperaments from each other. Acropolis 669 seems to Payne to be a transitional figure; the kore has a body structure close to the older model, but the eyes have been reduced in size and the Nasolacrimal ducts are marked, as in all later korai. From this kore onwards, the Ionian costume assumes a standardised form based on the depth and looseness of the drapery of the himation and on the playful representation of the material. Ernst Langlotz does not considerthe combination of old and new elements sufficient justification for a higher dating and places this kore, like Acropolis 678 at the end of the century.

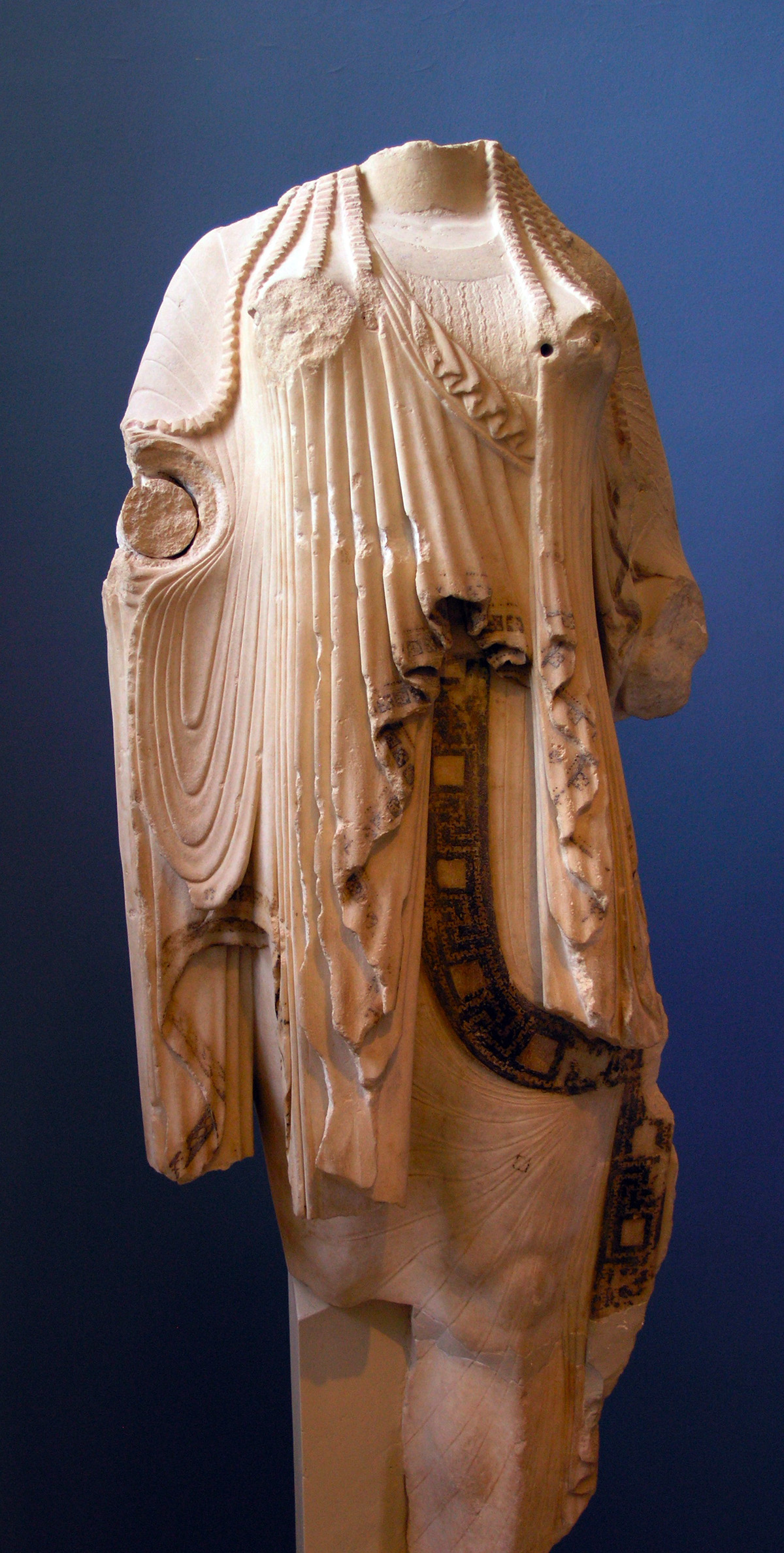
Acr. 594, c. 520–510 BC

The last thirty years of the 6th century are characterised by great attention to the shaping of the face and to the decoration of surfaces, especially visible in the treatment of hair and clothes. An example of this is Acropolis 682, which is comparable to the caryatids of the Siphnian Treasury, as well as the head, Acropolis 660. Acropolis 594, datable to the 510s BC, with the epiblema worn over the himation, overcomes the dualism between drapery and the form below, as only the creator of the Kore of Euthydikos manages to do. In this figure there is a particular correspondence between the size of the clothing and the body which does not nullify the complexity of the surface design, however.

The Antenor Kore (Acropolis 681) could be considered an interpretation of this theme by its creator. The connection of the statue with the inscribed base which identifies the creator of the statue as the Athenian sculptor Antenor has been doubted, but it was in any case the work of a master: the treatment of the clothes with deep vertical grooves, alternating with horizontal markings is not found on any of the other figures from the Acropolis.

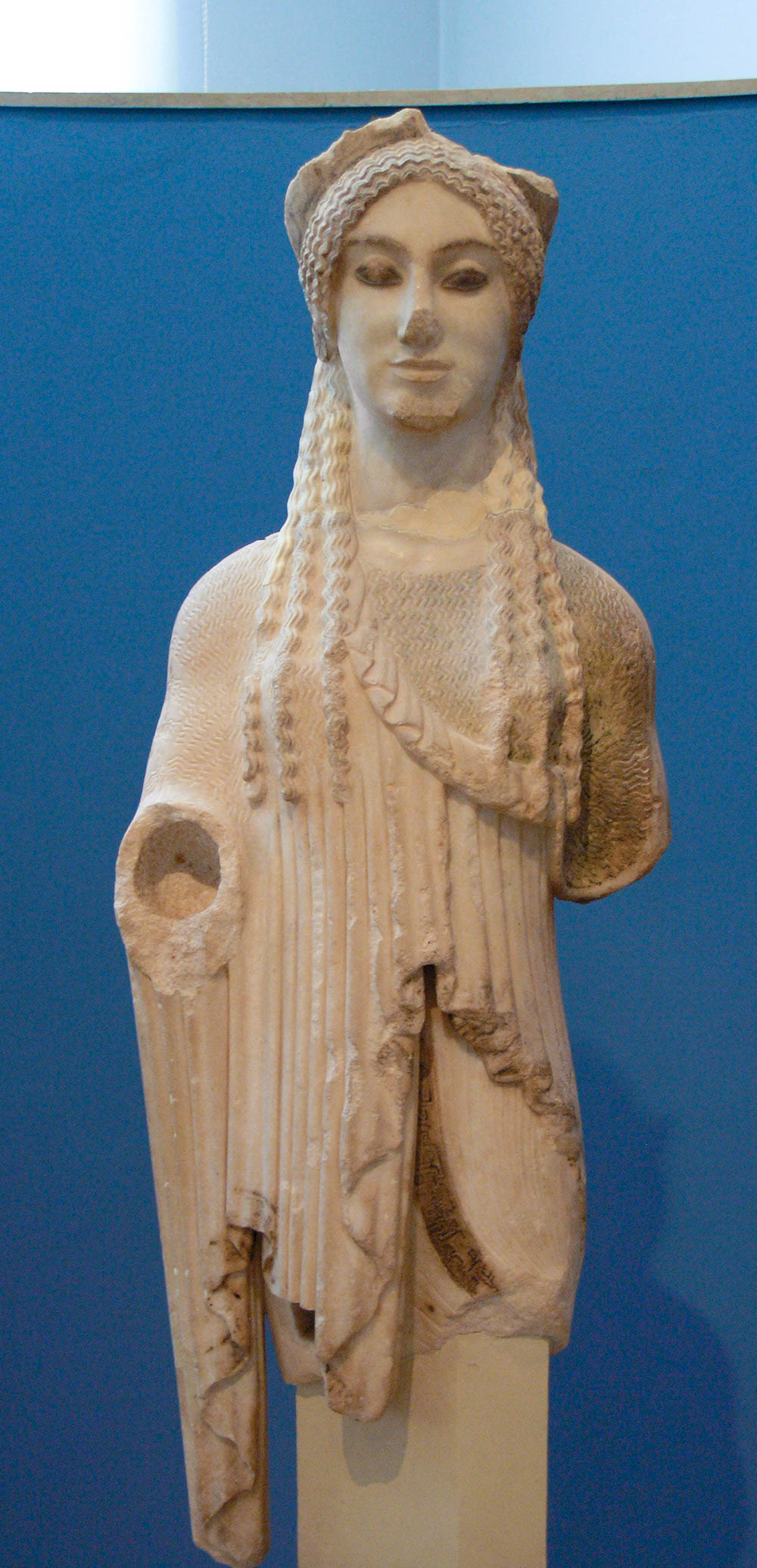
Acr. 674, c.500–490 BC

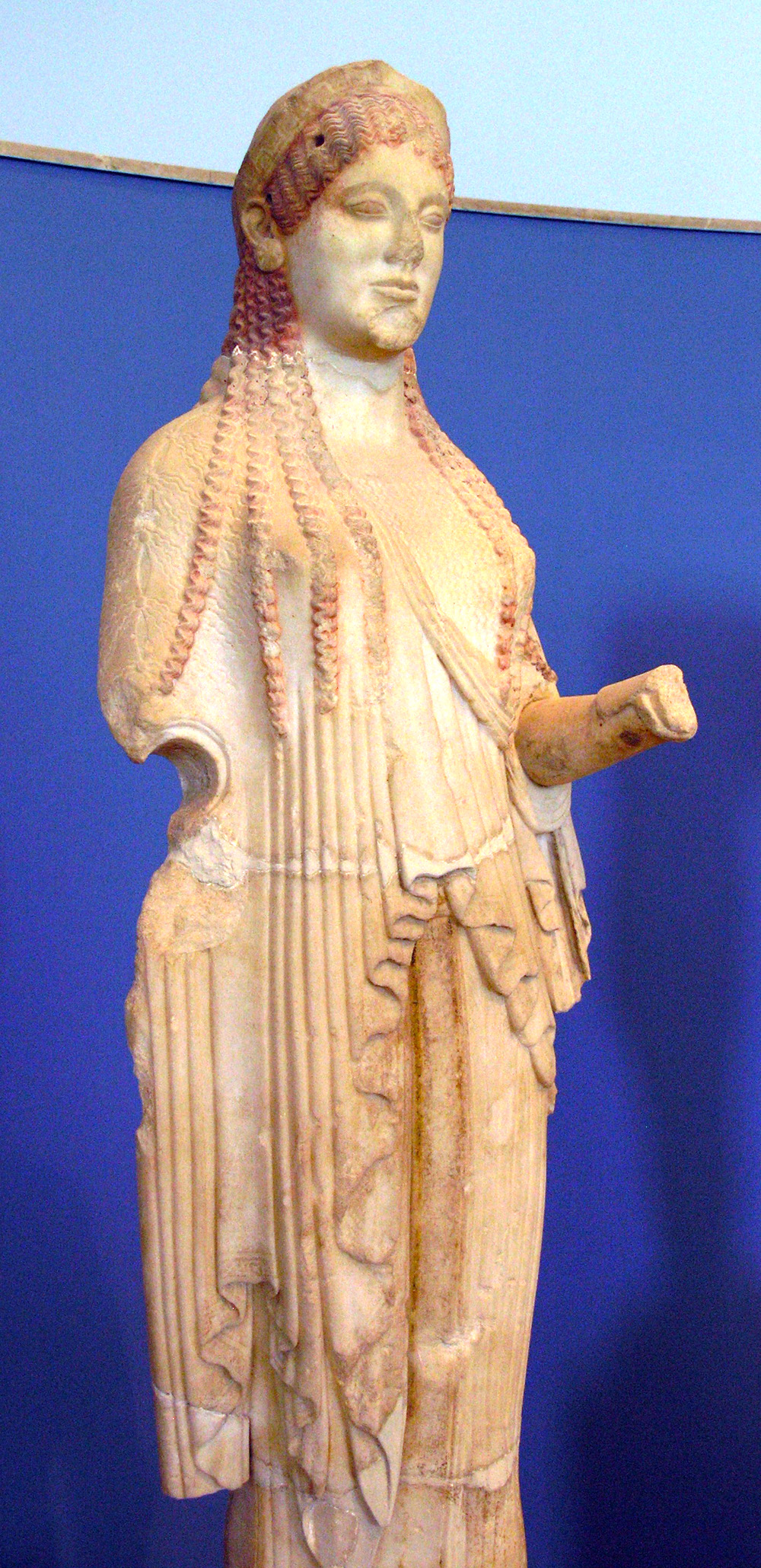
Acr.685, c.500-490 BC

The kore Acropolis 674 is unique in its body structure: a long, thick neck and sloping shoulders contrast with head which is a little heavy. The facial expression is underlined by a new understatement in details of the hairstyle and clothing. The modelling of the face anticipates, at the turn of the century, the simplification which is found in the Kore of Euthydikos and in Classical sculpture. The "Archaic smile" disappears with Acropolis 685, which has a similar structure but has an unusual pose: both hands were extended with offering and as a result her clothing is not gathered up and falls vertically, following the line of her body. Ranuccio Bianchi Bandinelli attributes these korai to a single master whose stylistic fingerprint she also sees in the Kore of Euthydikos and the Blond Ephebe.

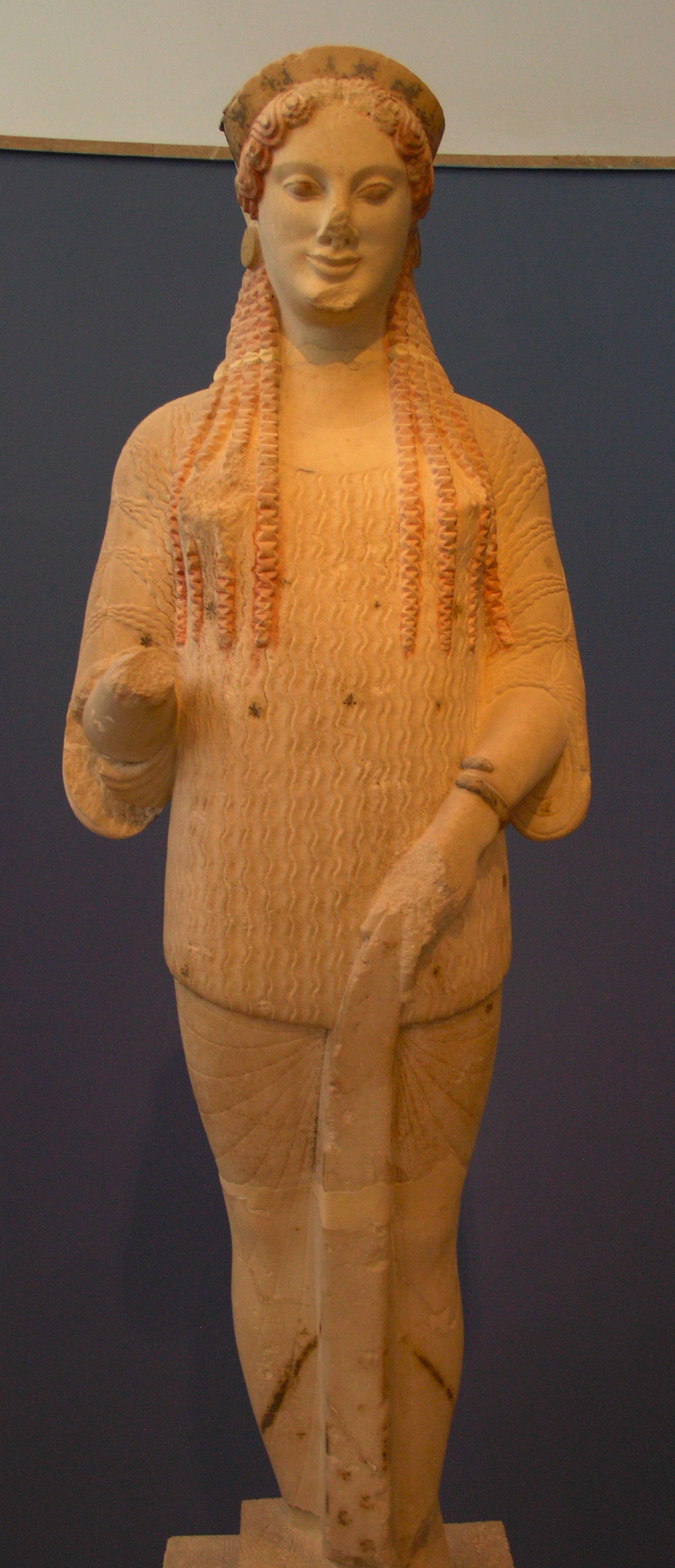
Acr. 670, c.520–500 BC

Acropolis 670 also has an unusual form, dressed only in a chiton with a belt at the waist which creates a large overhang with the fabric above it, a fashion which corresponds to an old Ionian motif but is unusual in this period. The head Acropolis 643 is one of the masterpieces of Attic sculpture, one of the very few female heads which equal the Rayet Head and the Sabouroff Head.

At the beginning of the 5th century the practice of offering korai as votives began to decline and there are only a few figures from the site which belong to this period. The Peplos Kore exhibits some aspects that point to the statue having Hellenistic origins. As the statue's outfit is notably different from the rest of the Acropolis Korai, Dr. Steven Zucker and Dr. Beth Harris theorize that the sculpture's missing arm could have been carrying a bow which is often associated with the Greek deity Artemis. The oldest is Acropolis 684, which has an imposing structure and voluminous drapery. The special individuality of the head recalls Acropolis 674, but is even closer to the Kore of Euthydikos. Because of its similarity to a terracotta head of Athena found at Olympia in 1940, it has been considered the work of a Peloponnesian artist.

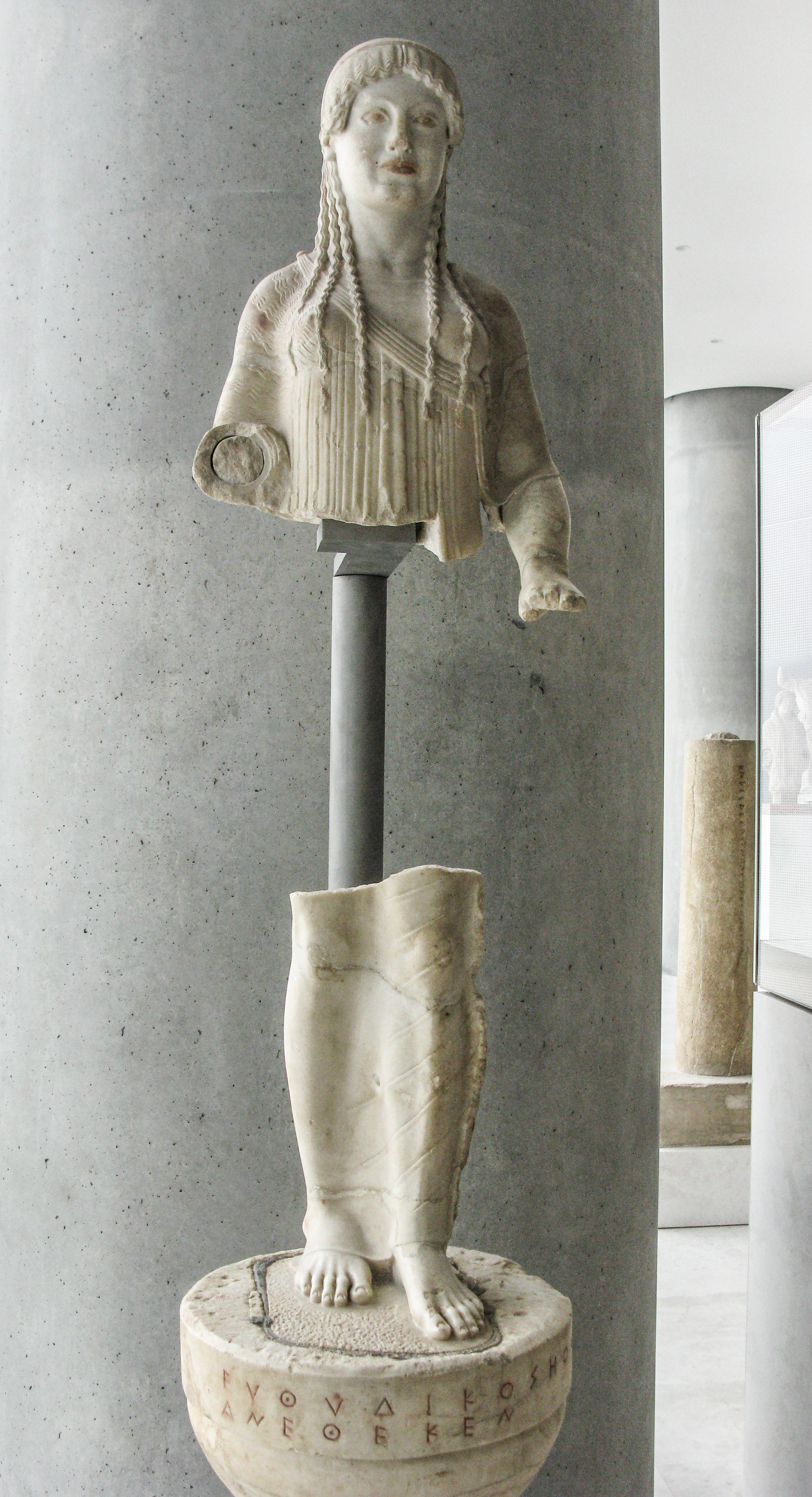
Euthydikos Kore

The fragmentary Acropolis 696 seems to belong with Acropolis 684 and the kore dedicated by Euthydikos. The face has a wide and uniform appearance, the mouth approaches the form taken by the Kore of Euthydikos and the hair is treated in a simple style. The Attic sculptors began to abandon the complex surface decoration which was used in the earlier period. A new way of thinking replaced the old and many of the forms characteristic of this new style seem to come from Peloponnesian bronzes, just as the Euthydikos Kore, through the Blonde Ephebe, seems stylistically similar to the Apollo of the pediment of the Temple of Zeus at Olympia.

== Bibliography ==
- Guy Dickins, Catalogue of the Acropolis Museum : 1. Archaic sculpture, Cambridge, Cambridge University Press, 1912.
- Jean Charbonneaux, Roland Martin; François Villard, La Grecia arcaica : (620-480 a.C.), Milano, Rizzoli, 1978. no ISBN.
- Humfry Payne, Paolo Enrico Arias, La scultura arcaica in marmo dell'Acropoli, Roma, L'Erma di Bretschneider, 1981, ISBN 88-7062-500-1.
- Ranuccio Bianchi Bandinelli, Enrico Paribeni, L'arte dell'antichità classica. Grecia, Torino, UTET Libreria, 1986, ISBN 88-7750-183-9..
