= Angelitos Athena =

Ancient Greek sculpture from the Acropolis of Athens

- Greek: Αγγέλιτος Αθηνά
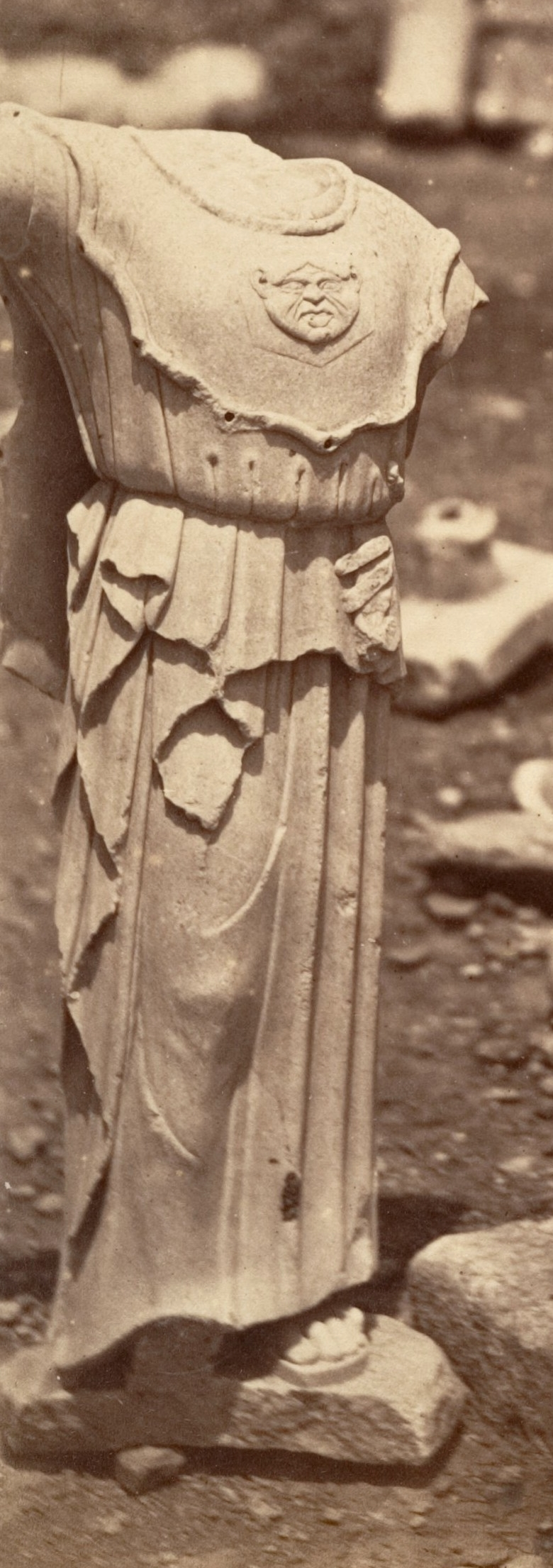
- Perserschutt 1866, Angelitos-Athena
- Year: 480-470 BC
- Catalogue: No 140
- Movement: Between archaic and classical
- Subject: Athena armed
- Location: Acropolis Museum, Athens
- Owner: Greece
- Website: https://www.theacropolismuseum.gr

The Angelitos Athena is an ancient marble statue, which was made around 480–470 BC. The figure, the earliest known depiction of the armed Athena, is an example of the severe style, the transitional style between archaic and classical Greek sculpture which developed after the Persian Wars. Today it is located at the Acropolis Museum under the inventory number 140.

== Description ==
The statue is heavily damaged and has lost its head. Like earlier depictions of Athena she wears the archaic peplos, but she also has the aegis over her shoulders, with a gorgoneion in the centre of her chest. Her upraised right arm survives up to the wrist and once held a spear. Her left arm is entirely missing except for the shoulder and traces of her left hand resting on her waist.

The statue is believed, not completely uncontroversially, to have stood atop a preserved Doric column which reads:

Angelitos dedicated me. Venerable Athena, may this gift be pleasing to you. Euenor made it

It was found under the Perserschutt on the Akropolis in Athens, near the Kritios Boy and the Moschophoros.
