= Cheramyes =

6th-century BC Greek nobleman

Cheramyes was a nobleman on the island of Samos, Greece. He apparently lived during the mid-6th century BC. The only ancient references to him are the dedications of several statues unearthed at the Temple of Hera on Samos.
