= Euthydikos Kore =

Greek sculpture c 490–480 BCE

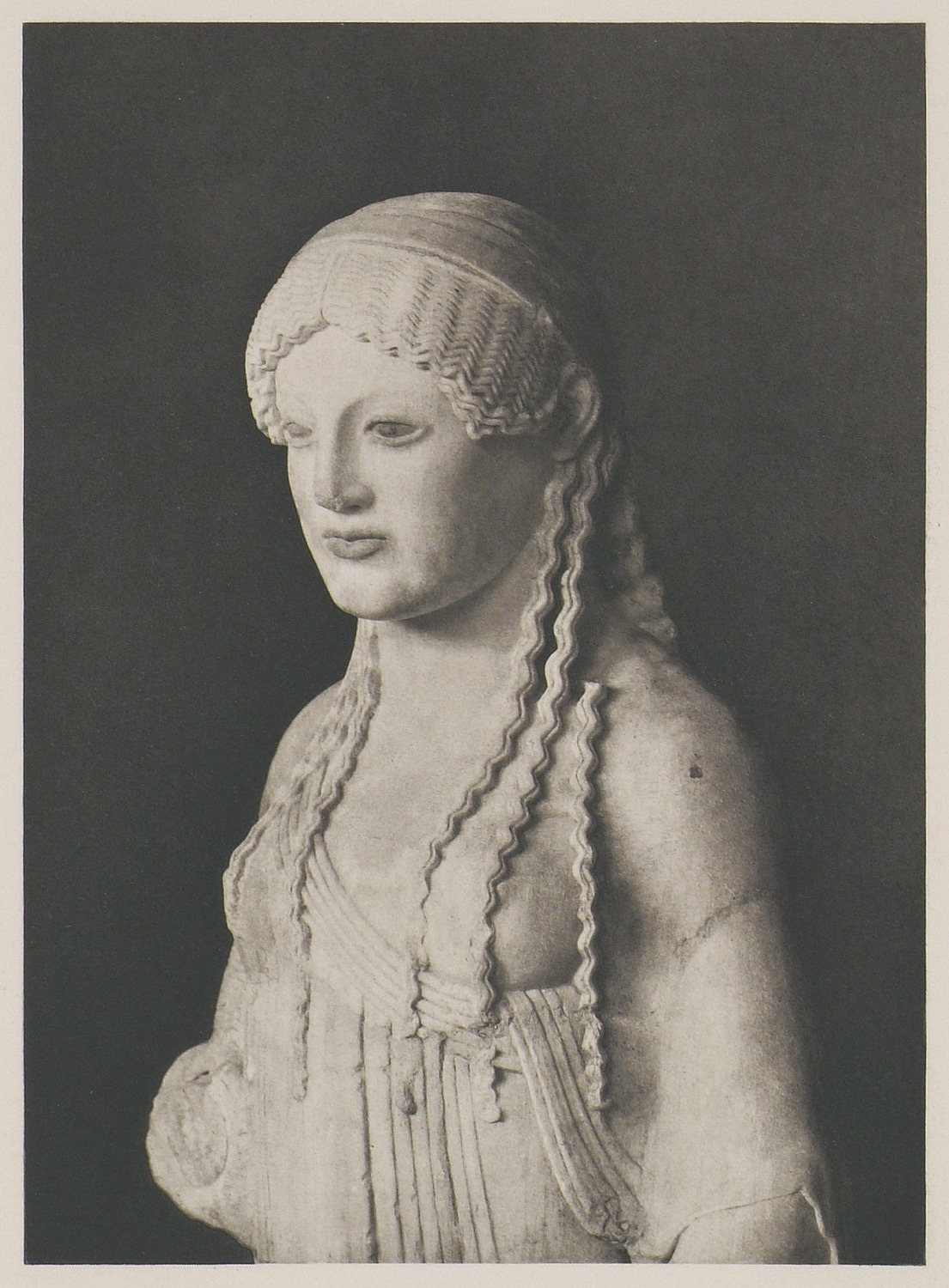
- Euthydikos Kore. Photographed by Frédéric Boissonnas, 1919
- Type: Kore
- Material: Parian marble
- Created: c. 490–480 BC
- Discovered: 1882, 1886–7; Athens, Attica, Greece
- Place: Acropolis Museum, Athens
- Culture: Archaic Greece

The Euthydikos Kore is a late Archaic, Parian marble statue of the kore type, dated to c. 490–480 BCE, that once stood amongst the votive sculptures on the Acropolis of Athens. It was destroyed during the Persian invasion of 480 BCE and found in the Perserschutt. It is named after the dedication on the base of the sculpture, "Euthydikos son of Thaliarchos dedicated [me]". It now stands in the Acropolis Museum.

The surviving statue consists of two parts; the upper torso and head and the lower legs, feet and base, with the middle missing. The complete statue would have stood at 1.28m. The upper part was found in 1882 east of the Parthenon and the lower part in 1886-7 near the Erechtheion. That the two pieces were related was a connection made by Winter. The figure stands with left leg advanced (“almost like a kouros”). Her right forearm, now missing, would have been raised. She wears a chiton and a short Ionic himation draped from the right shoulder. The himation was once decorated with painted bands which Winter discerns as depicting two four-horse chariots, wrapping around the figure's left shoulder and disappearing behind her hair. A Nike may have appeared above the rightmost chariot, marking it out as victorious, but it is no longer visible. She also wears a taenia wound twice around the head. The eyes are heavy-lidded with both Lacrimal caruncle and canthus indicated. The lips are full, but with corners turning down and no archaic smile. (Note: Hence the statue is sometimes called "La Boudeuse" - the pouter.) In the ears both tragus and antitragus are present. The throat and collarbone are both lightly indicated. The metatarsals are depicted on the sculpture’s bare feet.

The base is a round Doric column capital, with the inscription, highlighted with red paint, running around the abacus. The layout of the text meant that the viewer could read the most crucial part of the text from a frontal position ("Euthydikos... dedicated [me]"), but required them to move around the sculpture in order to read the whole text. This movement of the viewer mirrors that of the chariots on the figure's himation.

Stylistically the statue marks the transition from the late archaic to the Severe Style. Described by Jeffrey Hurwit as 'an early classical statue in archaic dress', the Euthydikos kore exhibits a sense of volume and structure under the drapery that was novel. Since she is perhaps the last in the series of Acropolis korai and represents the beginning of the new style, the dating of the statue is of some significance. As stated, the bust was taken from a trench dug to the east of the Parthenon by Panagiotis Efstratiadis in 1882, though the stratigraphy of this trench had been compromised the layer in which the kore was found in was taken to be the Perserschutt. However, as Andrew Stewart argues this layer may be Kimonian or Periklean backfill against the south wall. Further, Stewart maintains that the burning observed on the Euthydikos kore is in fact colouration, that the kore can be grouped with the archaising Pig Relief and that the kore is by the same sculptor as the Blonde Boy. He also notes that the kore is not facially mutilated, suggesting that it was not vandalised by the Persians. This implies that the kore’s date may be placed later in the 470s and that the Severe Style developed after the Median War and perhaps as a consequence of it.

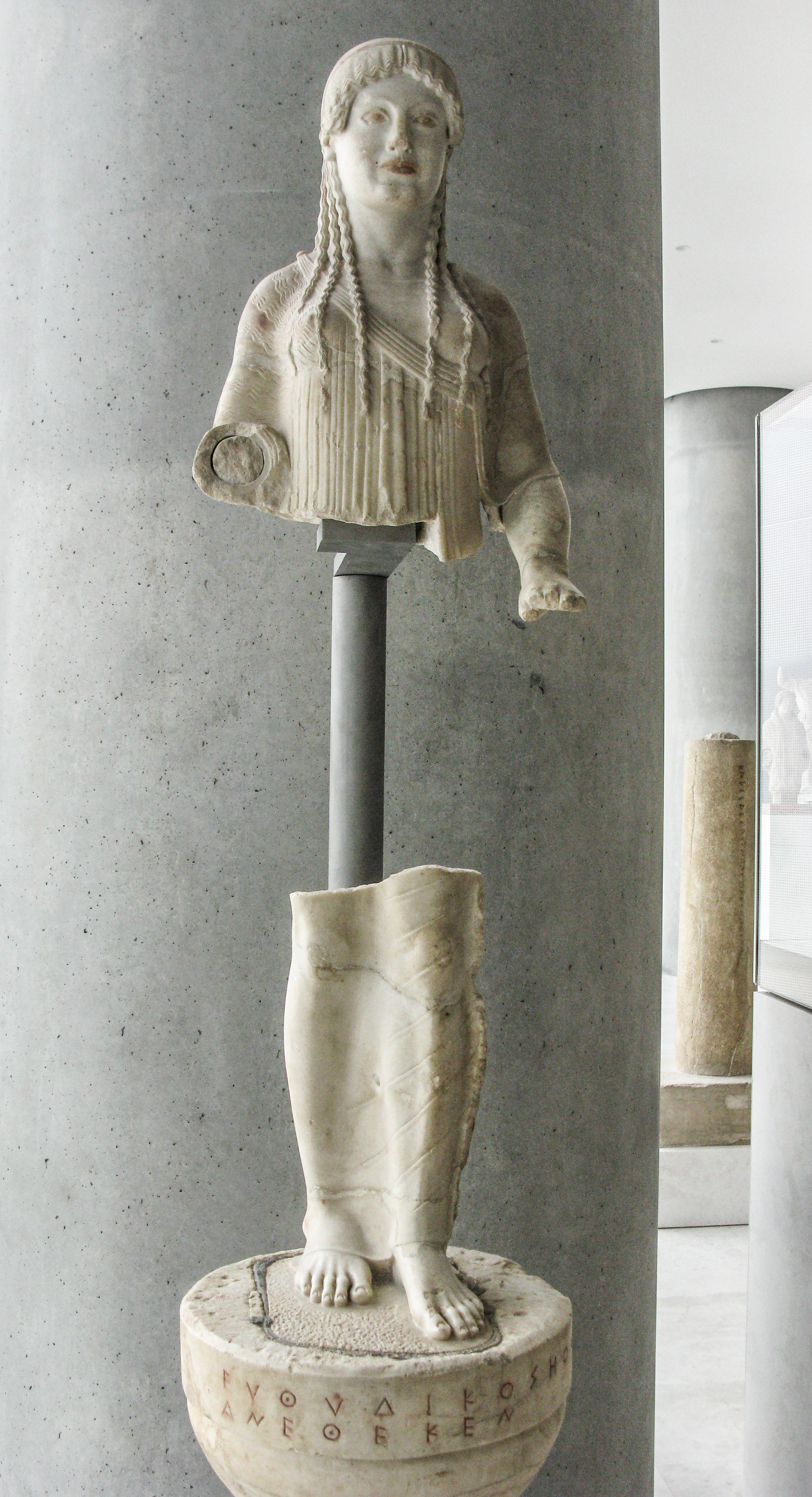
Reassembled Kore.

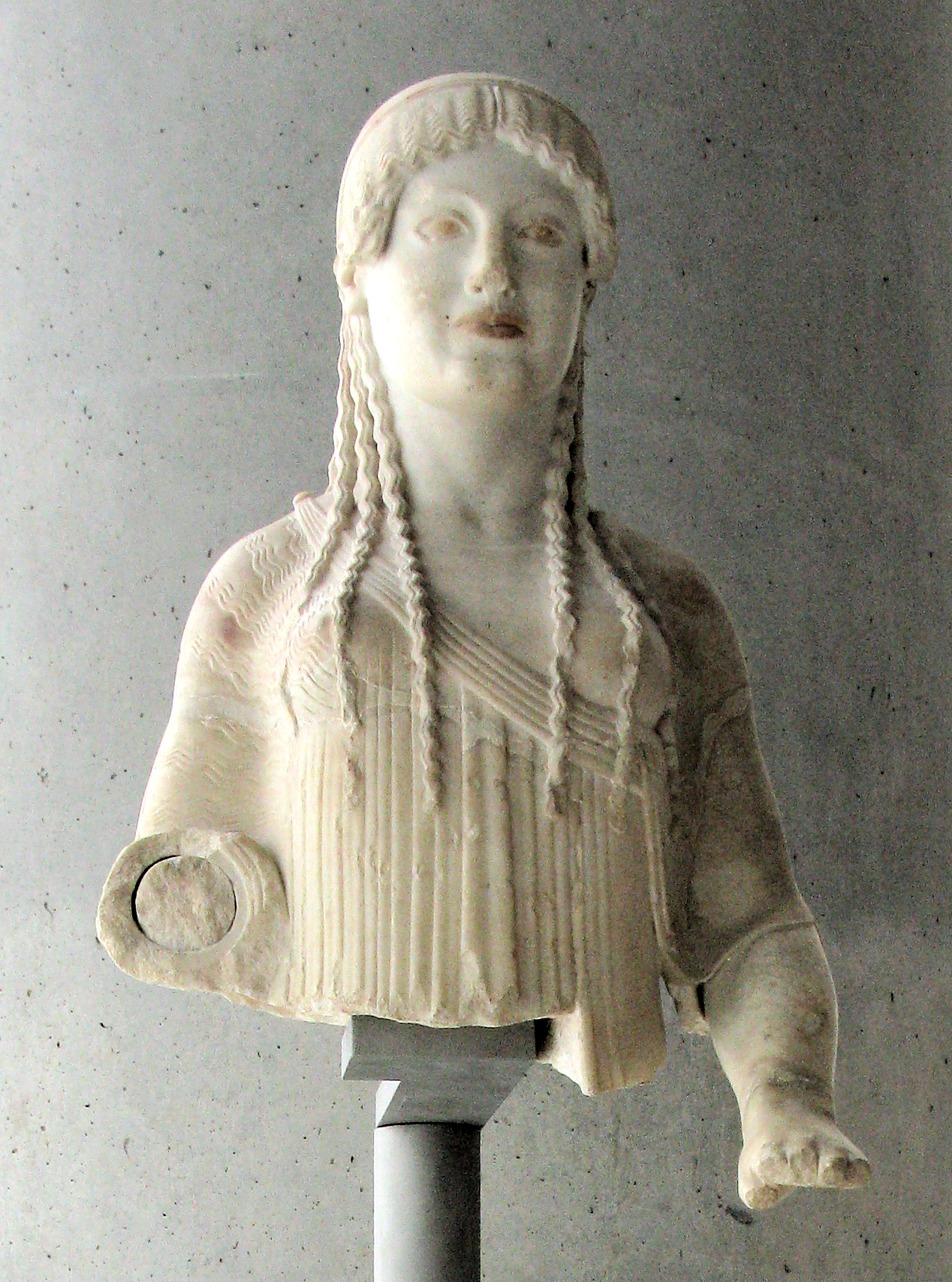
Torso.

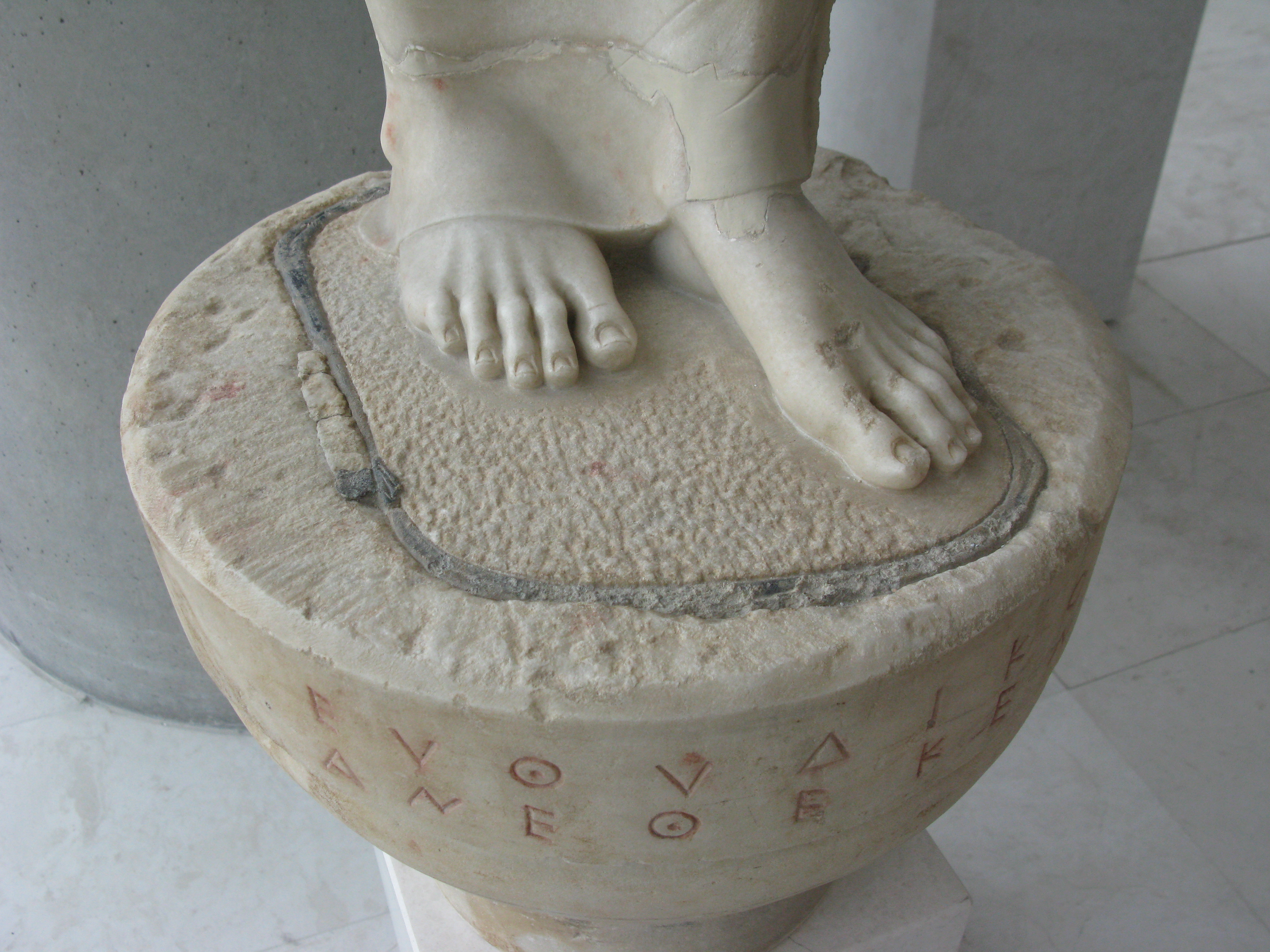
Base with inscription.

== Bibliography ==
- Dickins, G. (1912). Catalogue of the Acropolis Museum. Cambridge.
- Duby, Georges; Bruneau, Philippe; Daval, Jean-Luc (1999). Sculpture: From Antiquity to the Middle Ages: From the Eighth Century BC to the Fifteenth Century. Cologne: Taschen. ISBN 9783822870594.
- Fouquet, Johannes (2022). "Inscriptions and Bodily Kinaesthetics in Archaic and Early Classical Sculpture". In Dietrich, Nikolaus; Fouquet, Johannes (eds.). Image, Text, Stone : Intermedial Perspectives on Graeco-Roman Sculpture. Berlin: De Gruyter. pp. 144–177. ISBN 978-3-11-077569-3.
- Hurwit, Jeffrey M. (1985). The Art and Culture of Early Greece, 1100–480 B.C. New York: Cornell University Press. ISBN 9780801494017.
- Karakasi, K. (2003). Archaic Korai. Getty.
- Payne, H.; Mackworth-Young, G. (1950). Archaic Marble Sculpture from the Acropolis: A Photographic Catalogue.
- Raubitscheck, A. E. (1949). Dedications from the Athenian Akropolis. A Catalogue of the Inscriptions of the Sixth- Fifth c. B.C.
- Richter, G. M. A. (1968). Korai, Greek Archaic Maidens. Phaidon.
- Ridgway, Brunilde Sismondo (1970). The Severe Style in Greek Sculpture. Princeton University Press. ISBN 9780691100739.
- Stewart, A. (2008). "The Persian and Carthaginian Invasions of 480 B.C.E. and the Beginning of the Classical Style: Part 1, the Stratigraphy, Chronology, and Significance of the Acropolis Deposits". American Journal of Archaeology. 112 (3): 377–412. doi:10.3764/aja.112.3.377. S2CID 161825487.
