= Perserschutt =

Ancient fosse in the Acropolis of Athens

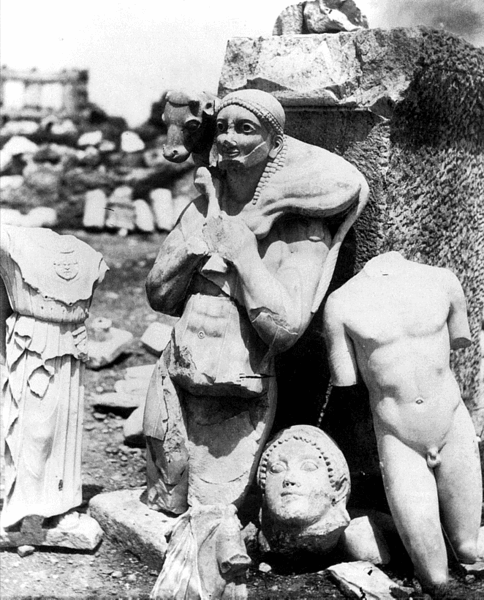
The Perserschutt photographed in 1866, just after the first excavation was completed. The famous Kritios Boy appears on the right.

The Perserschutt (lit. 'Persian rubble' or 'Persian debris'), as it is called in the German language, is the collection of ancient votive and architectural sculptures that belonged to the Acropolis of Athens before being destroyed during the second Persian invasion of Greece, which took place between 480 and 479 BCE. After defeating the Achaemenid Empire, the Greeks cleared and buried what was left of the Acropolis following the Persian destruction of Athens and subsequently rebuilt the city. A team of French, German, and Greek archaeologists discovered and excavated what would become known as the Perserschutt in the 19th century, and a number of the collection's artefacts are on display at the Acropolis Museum.

== History ==
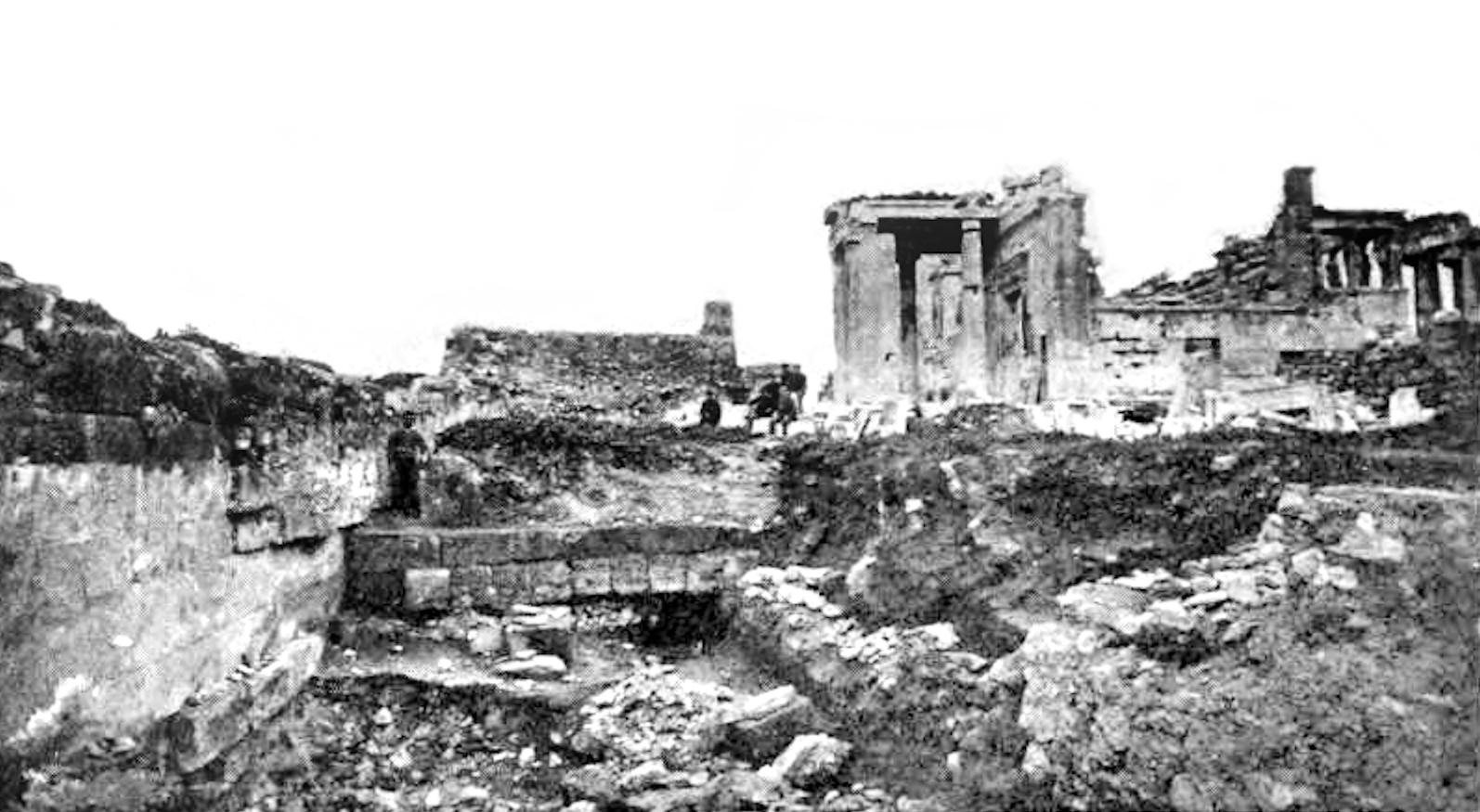
The Acropolis excavation pit, where some remains of Archaic statues were found, just northwest of the Erechtheion.

=== Greco-Persian Wars ===
The residents of Athens had been evacuated, and did not return until the Greek coalition routed the Persian army from the city. During the year-long Persian occupation, the Athenian city-state was sacked; Greek temples and other structures of significance were looted, vandalized, or razed to the ground. The desecrated items were buried ceremoniously by the Athenians after the Achaemenid Empire was expelled from their city. Later, the top of their Acropolis was cleared and their temples were rebuilt, with new works of sculpture having been created to be dedicated for the new temples.

=== Excavations at the Acropolis ===
Due to the burial, the artifacts' remains were preserved for more than 2000 years. They were first excavated by the French archaeologist Charles Ernest Beulé between 1863 and 1866. The remainder was discovered by Greek archaeologist Panagiotis Kavvadias and German architects Wilhelm Dörpfeld and Georg Kawerau between 1885 and 1890. The collection includes the Kritios Boy, the Calf Bearer, and the Angelitos Athena, among others. (Note: Details of the excavations were published in 1906. See references: Kavvadias, P., Kawerau, G.)

== Remains from the Perserschutt ==
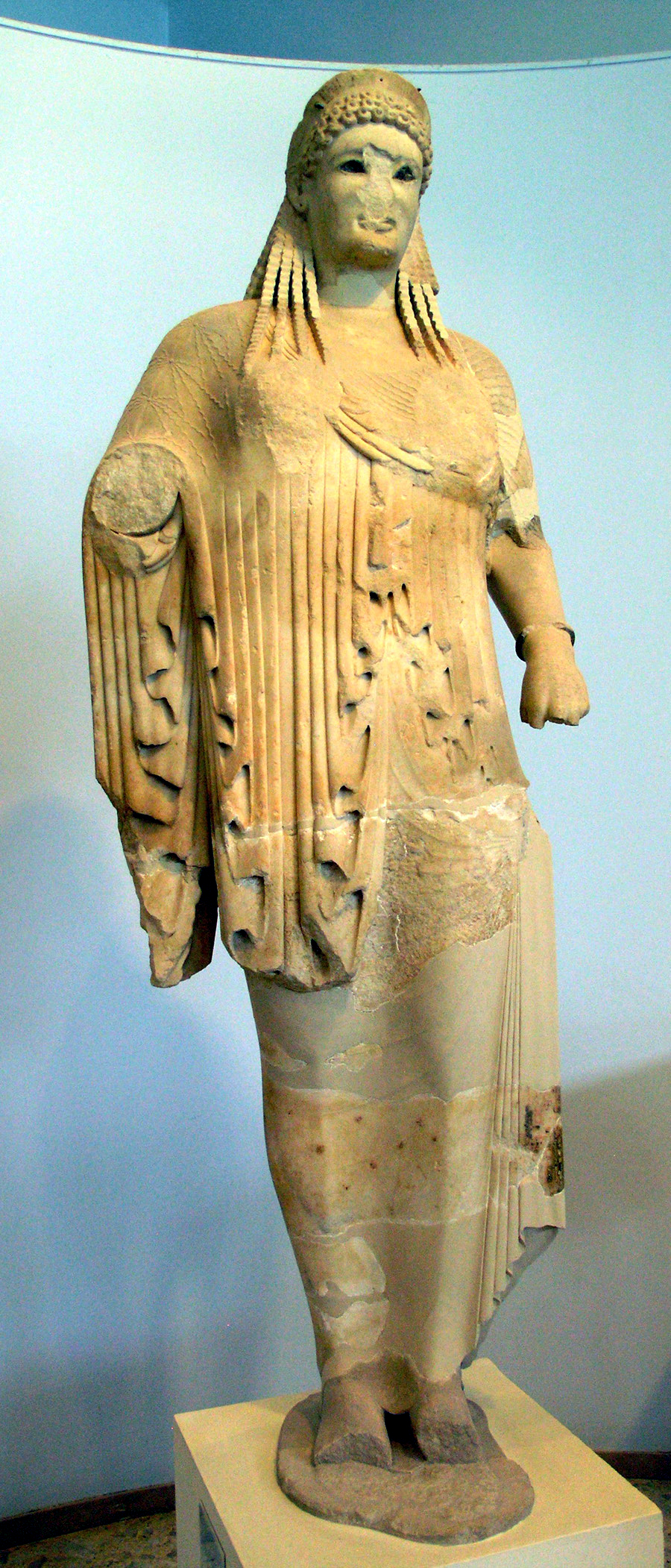
The Antenor Kore

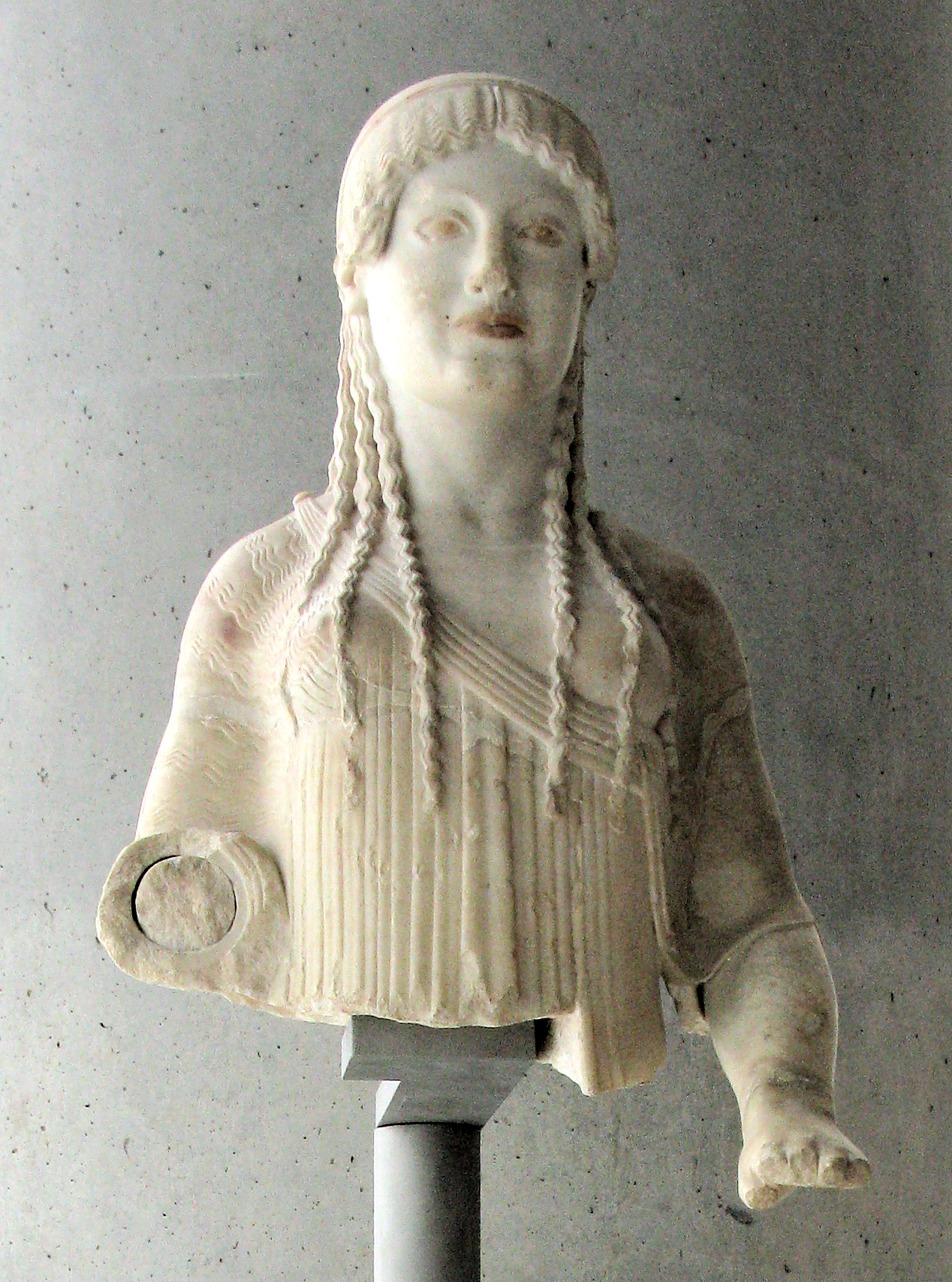
The Euthydikos Kore (detail)

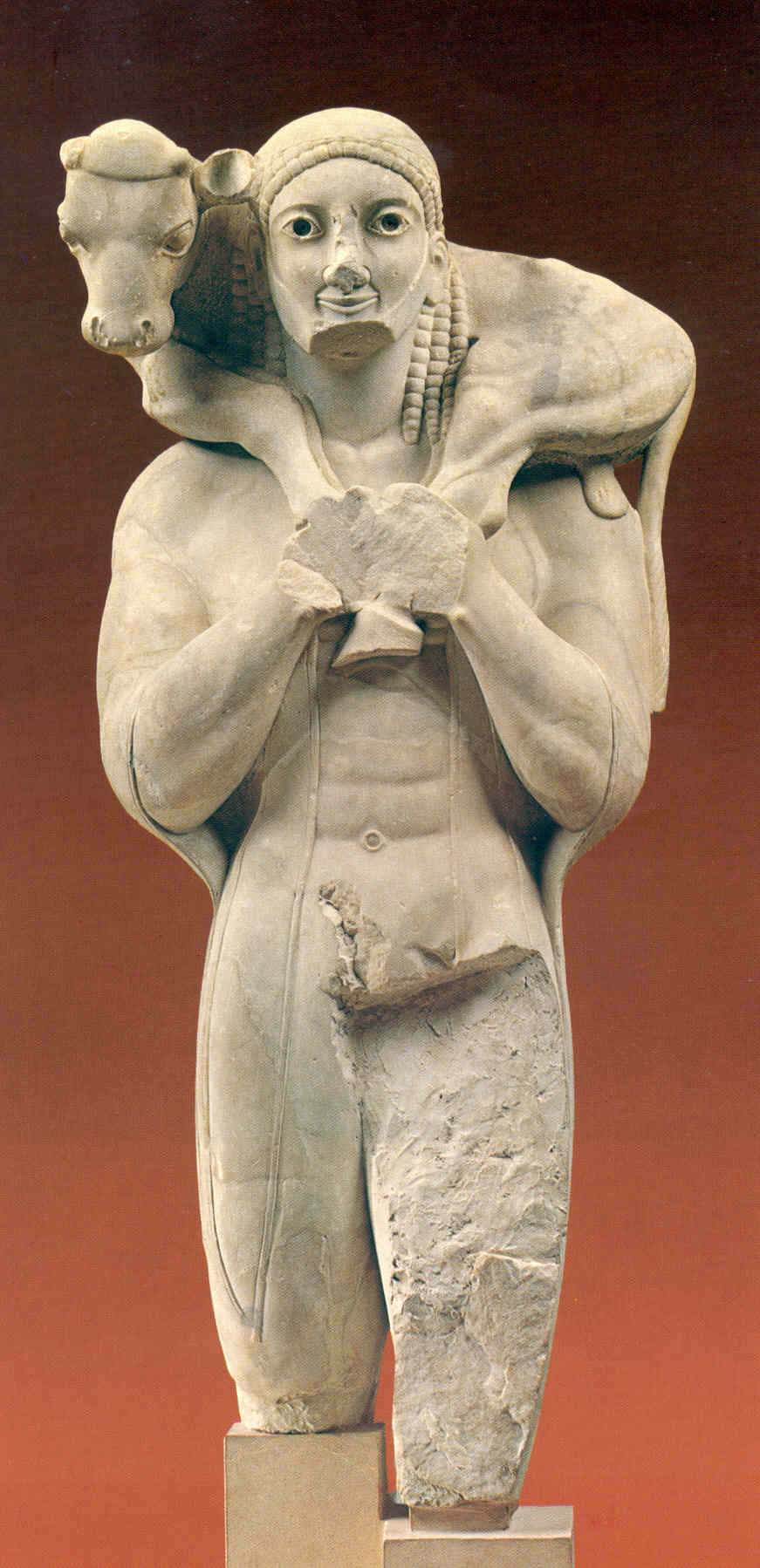
The Moscophoros

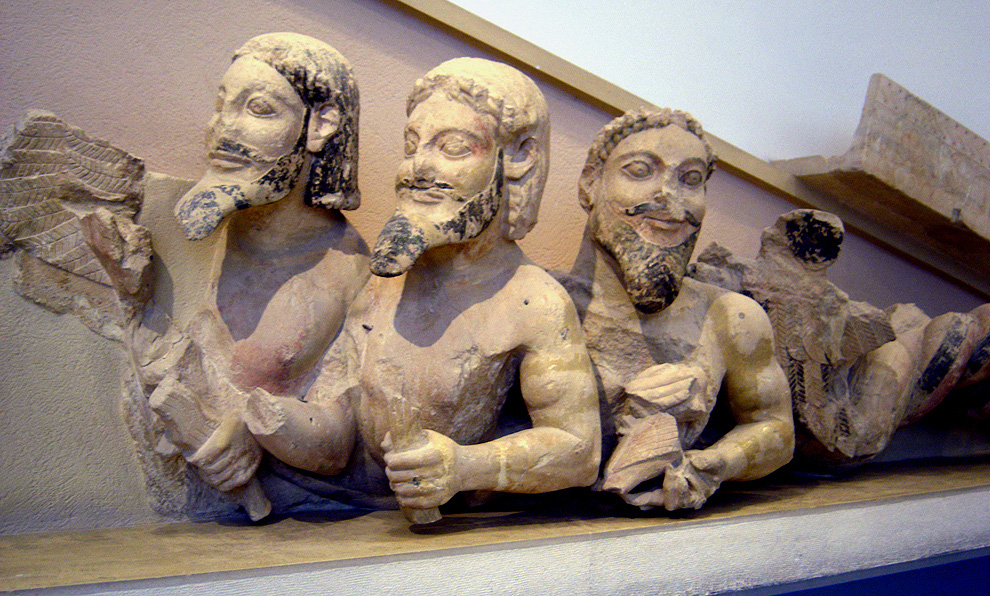
Part of the damaged Hekatompedon pediment (Three-bodied daemon)

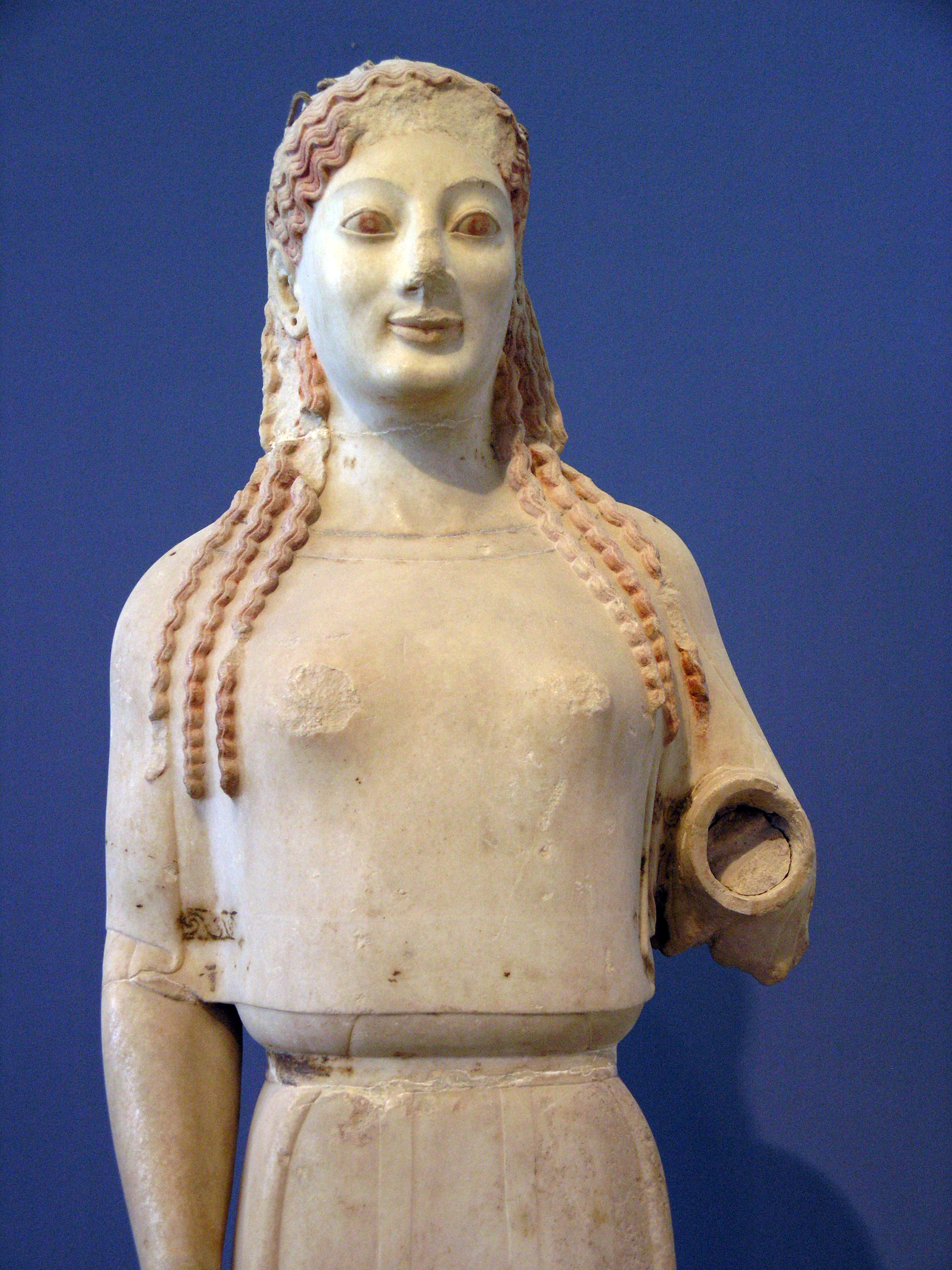
The Peplos Kore

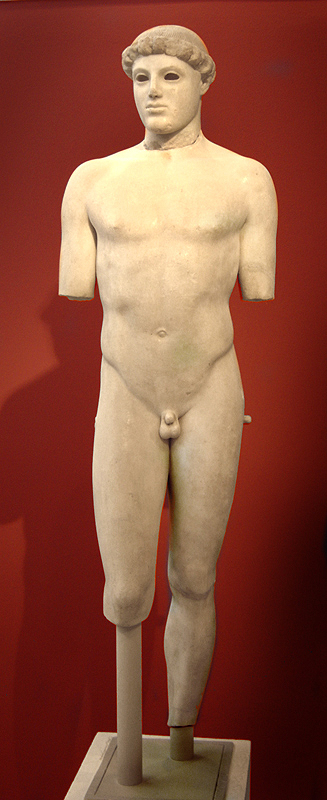
The Kritios Boy

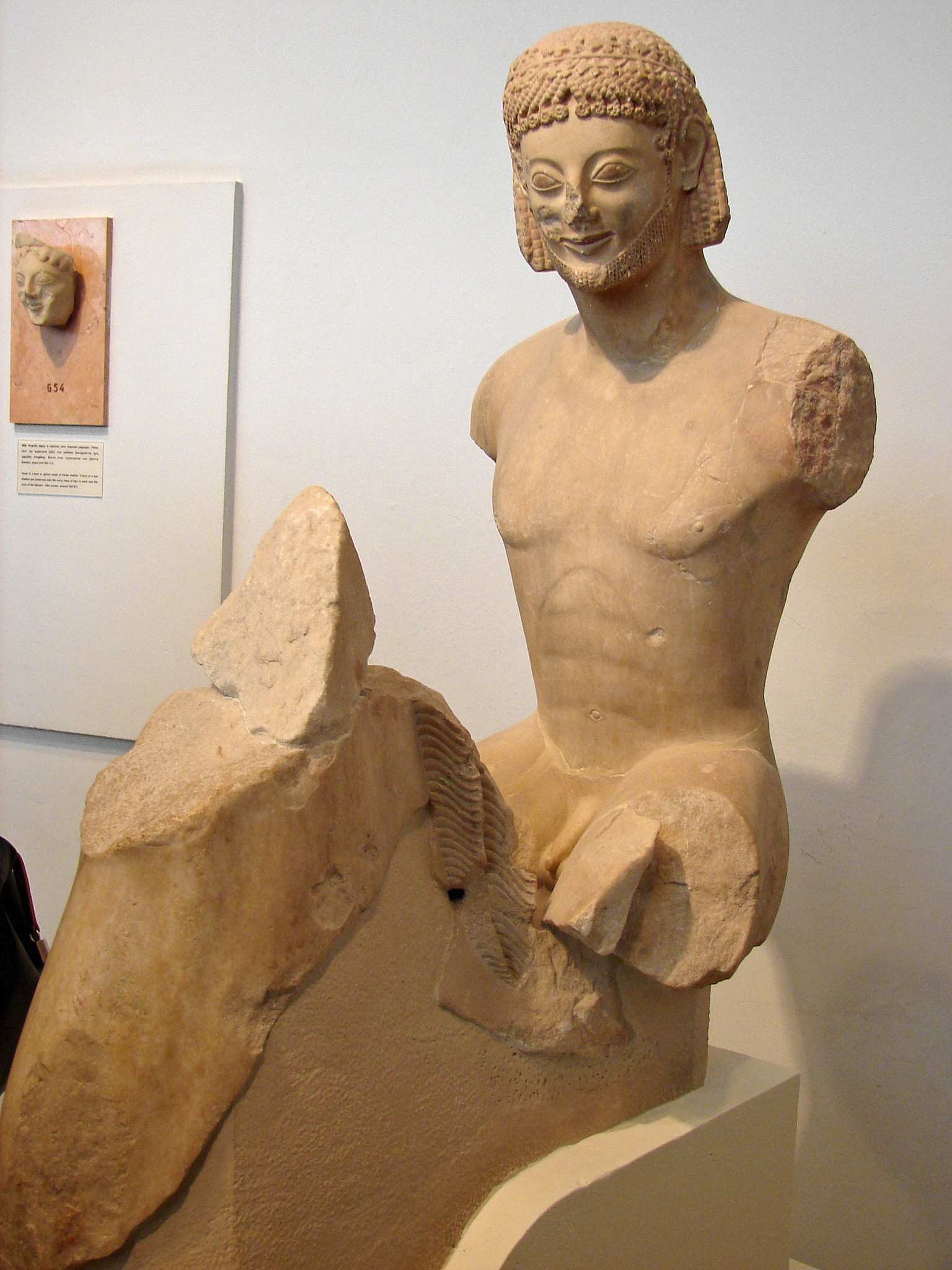
The Rampin Rider

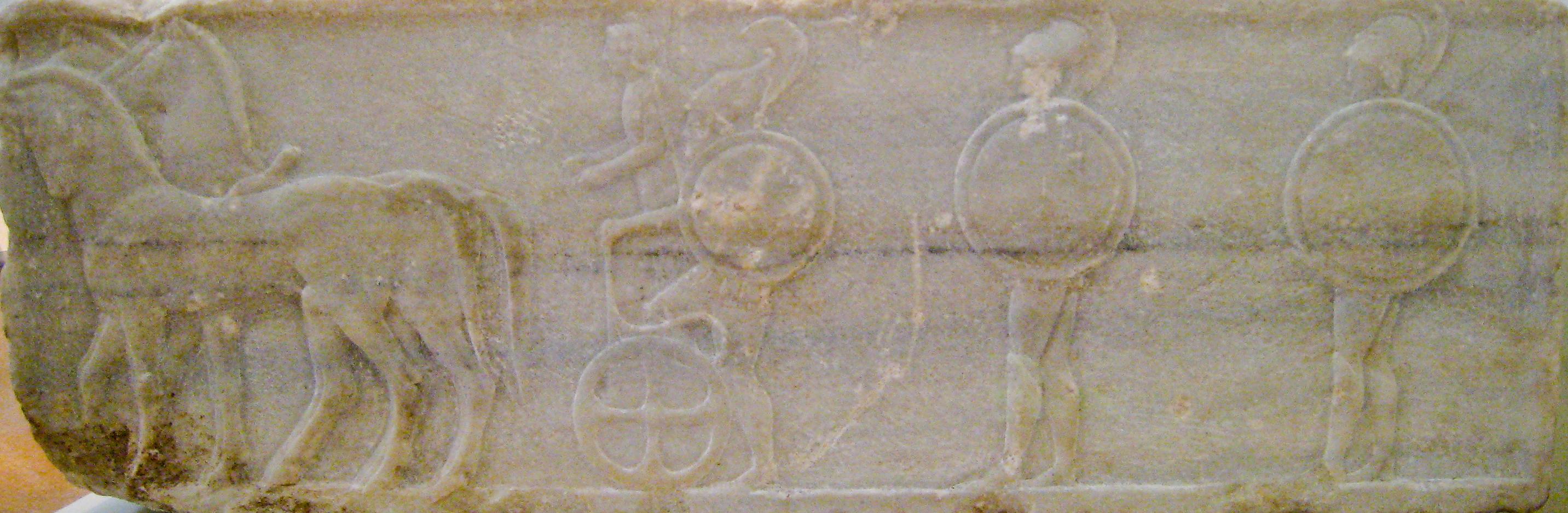
Chariot and hoplites, built into the Themistoclean Wall

== See also ==
- Archaic Acropolis
- Korai of the Acropolis of Athens
