= Rampin Rider =

Equestrian statue from Ancient Greece

Coordinates: 37.9687°N 23.7281°E

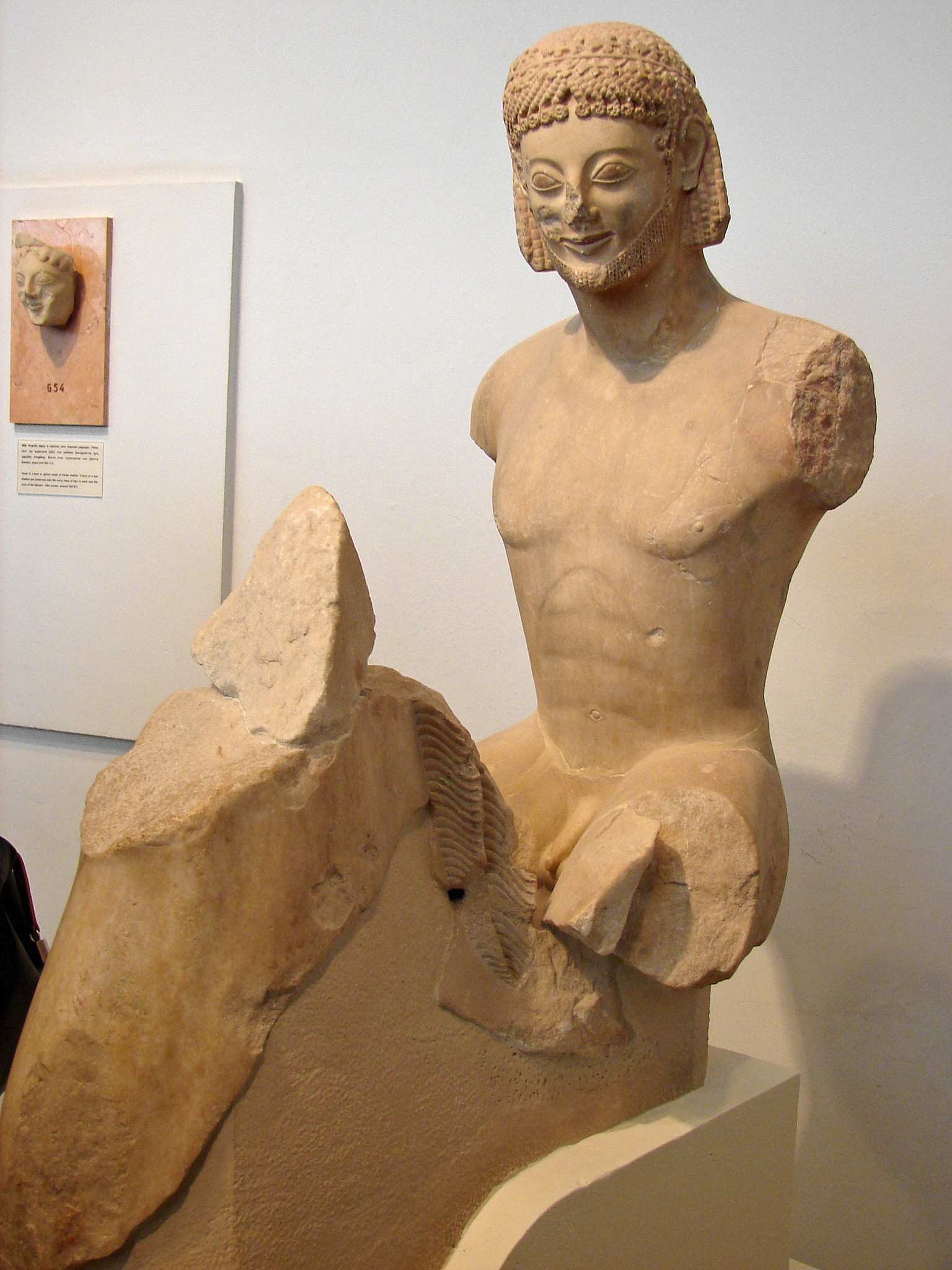
- Rampin Rider at the Acropolis Museum
- Material: Marble
- Size: height: 1.08 m
- Created: c. 550 BC
- Discovered: 1877; Athens, Attica, Greece
- Place: Acropolis Museum, Athens Louvre, Paris
- Culture: Archaic Greece

The Rampin Rider or Rampin Horseman (c. 550 BC) is an equestrian statue from the Archaic Period of Ancient Greece. It is made of marble, and has traces of red and black paint.

The head of the rider was found on the Acropolis of Athens in 1877 and donated to the Louvre. Parts of the body of the rider and horse were found ten years earlier in a Perserschutt ditch filled with statues broken during the 480 BC Persian sack of Athens. The head was not associated with the rest of the statue until 1936. The statue is displayed with a plaster cast of the head at the Acropolis Museum, while the head remains at the Louvre where it is displayed with a cast of the rest of the statue.

The rider has many of the features typical of an Archaic kouros, but has several asymmetrical features that break with the period's conventions.

== Interpretations ==
The statue was originally thought to be a part of a set of statues, perhaps paired with another as a mounted presentation of Castor and Pollux common on vases from this period. According to another theory, the statue represents the winner of a race. This theory is supported by the crown of lovage, given to winners of the Nemean Games and the Isthmian Games, on the statue.

== Gallery ==
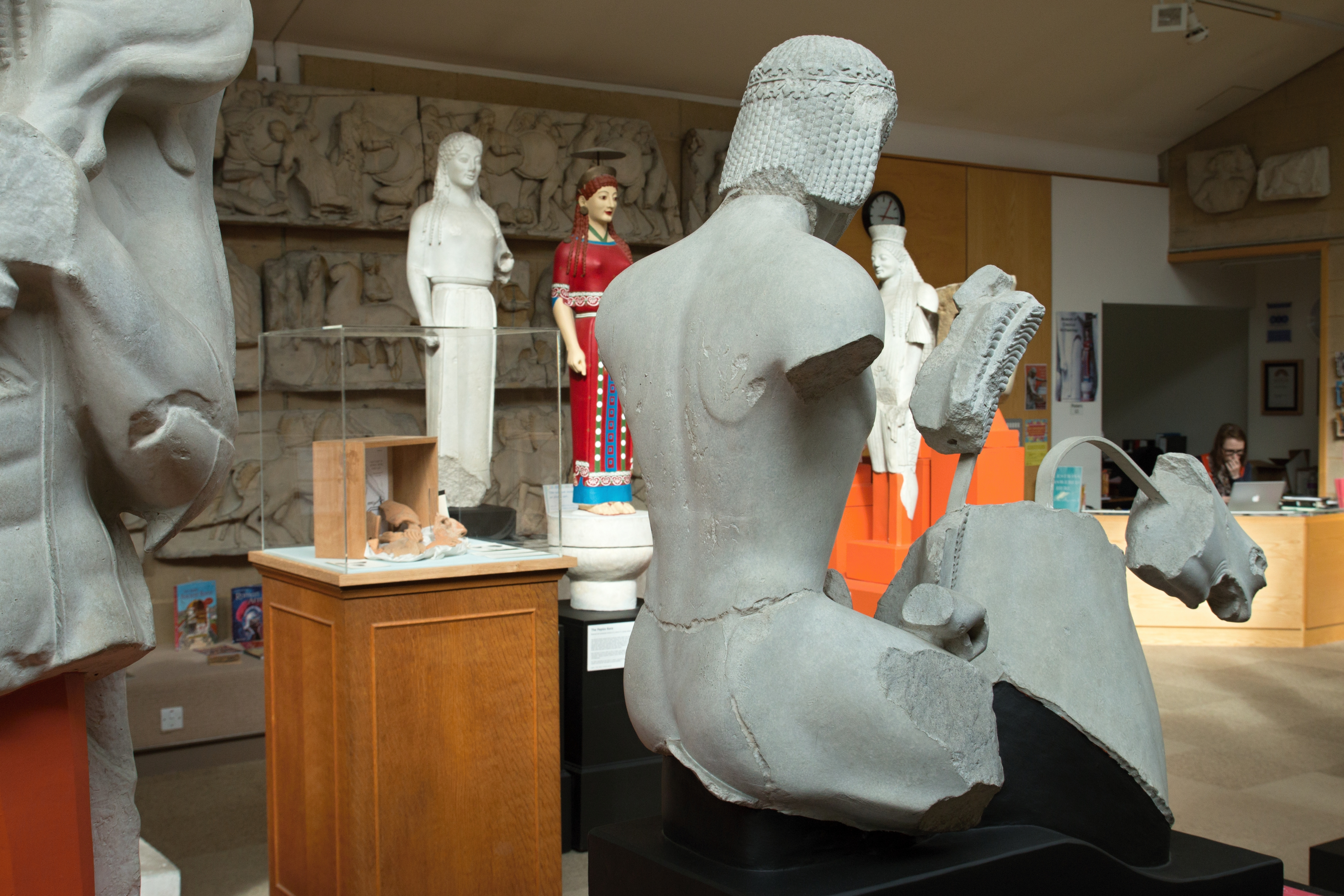
Rear view of a cast at the Museum of Classical Archaeology, Cambridge

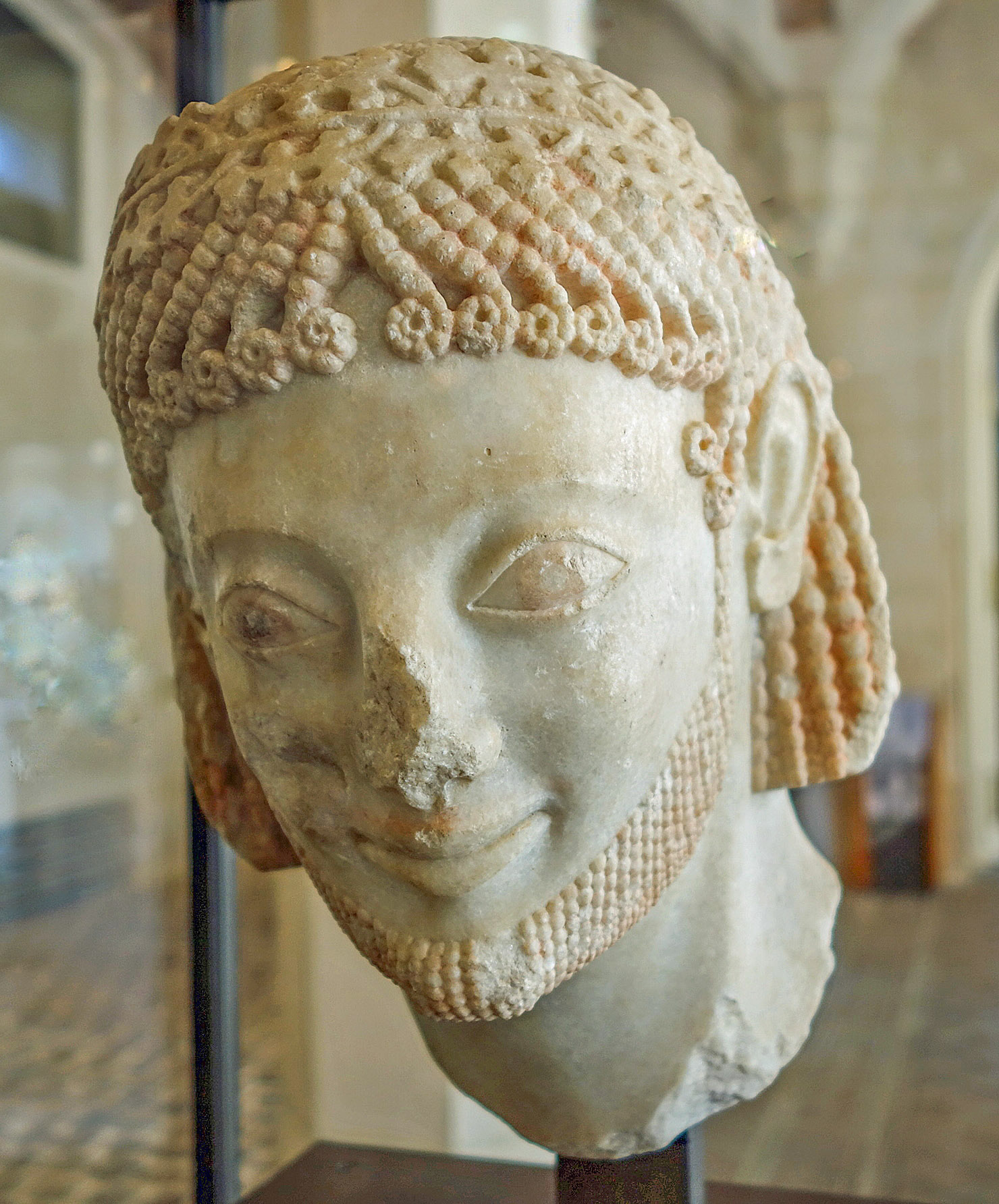
Original of the head, in the Louvre Museum

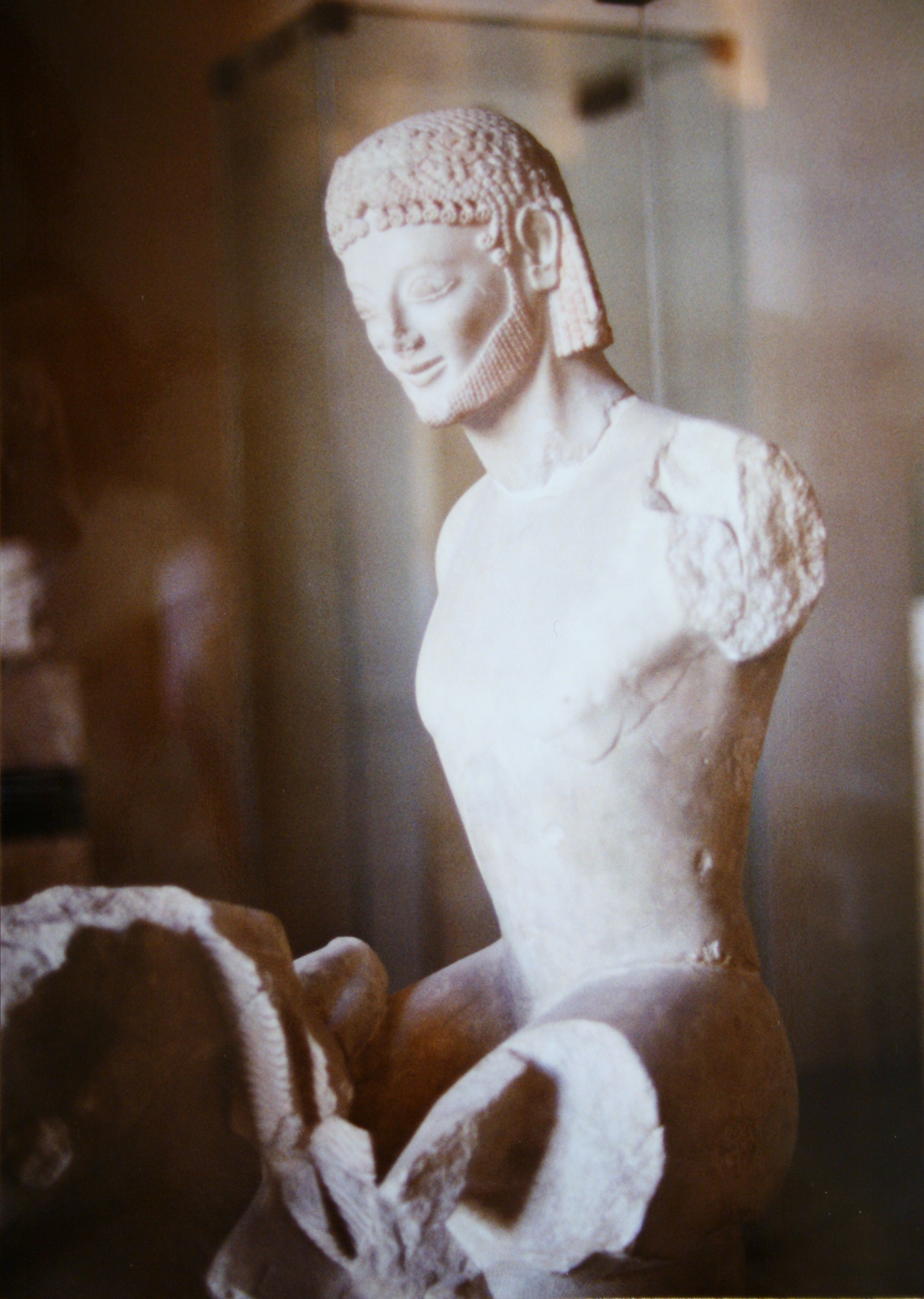
Reconstitution with plaster-cast body, Louvre Museum
