= Peplos Kore =

Ancient sculpture from the Acropolis of Athens

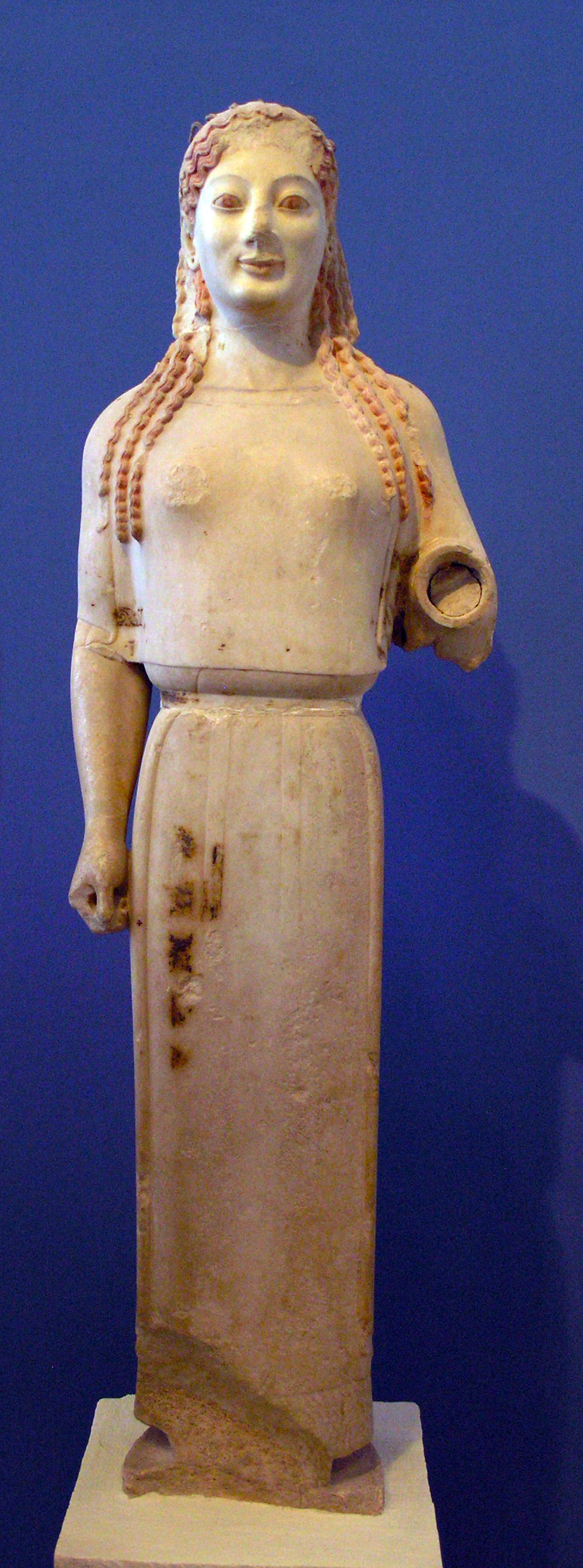
- Peplos Kore at the Acropolis Museum
- Type: Kore
- Material: Parian marble
- Created: c. 530 BC
- Discovered: 1886; Athens, Attica, Greece
- Place: Acropolis Museum, Athens
- Culture: Archaic Greece

The Peplos Kore is an ancient sculpture from the Acropolis of Athens. It is considered one of the best-known examples of Archaic Greek art. Kore is a type of archaic Greek statue that portrays a young woman with a stiff posture looking straight forward. Although this statue is one of the most famous examples of a kore, it is actually not considered a typical one. The statue is not completely straight, her face is leaned slightly to the side, and she is standing with her weight shifted to one leg. The other part of the statue's name, peplos, is based on the popular archaic Greek gown for women. When the statue was found it was initially thought that she was wearing a peplos, although it is now known that she is not.

The 118 cm-high (46 in) high white marble statue was made around 530 BC and originally was colourfully painted. The statue was found, in three pieces, in an 1886 excavation north-west of the Erechtheion on the Acropolis of Athens and is now in the Acropolis Museum in Athens.

The statue stands at approximately 1.18 m (3 ft 10 in) high. It is carved from fine grained Parian marble. Traces remain of the original paint.

== Description ==
The statue's title is derived from a popular archaic female dress, called peplos. It was initially thought that the statue was wearing a peplos, although modern scientists mostly reject this idea. The dress is far more likely an Anatolian long dress with a cape draped over. Bore holes on the head and shoulders indicate that the statue was decorated with bronze head decorations (probably a wreath) and shoulder fibulae. The left arm was made of a separate piece of stone and is now lost.

The Peplos Kore is ascribed to the Rampin Master, who is named for another head, very similar in style, which was in the Rampin Collection and is now on display in the Louvre.

Vinzenz Brinkmann argues this statue type does not depict mortal girls but goddesses. Her posture does not correspond to that of a typical late archaic kore, "who steps forward with her left leg, holds her skirt with her left hand and holds fruit in the crook of her right arm". The Peplos Kore has 35 bore holes in two rows around her head and one bore hole in her right hand, which suggests she may have worn a rayed crown or a helmet and held attributes such as a bow and arrows or a shield. The reconstructions of the Peplos Kore displayed in the Gods in Colour exhibition, for example, illustrate such possibilities.

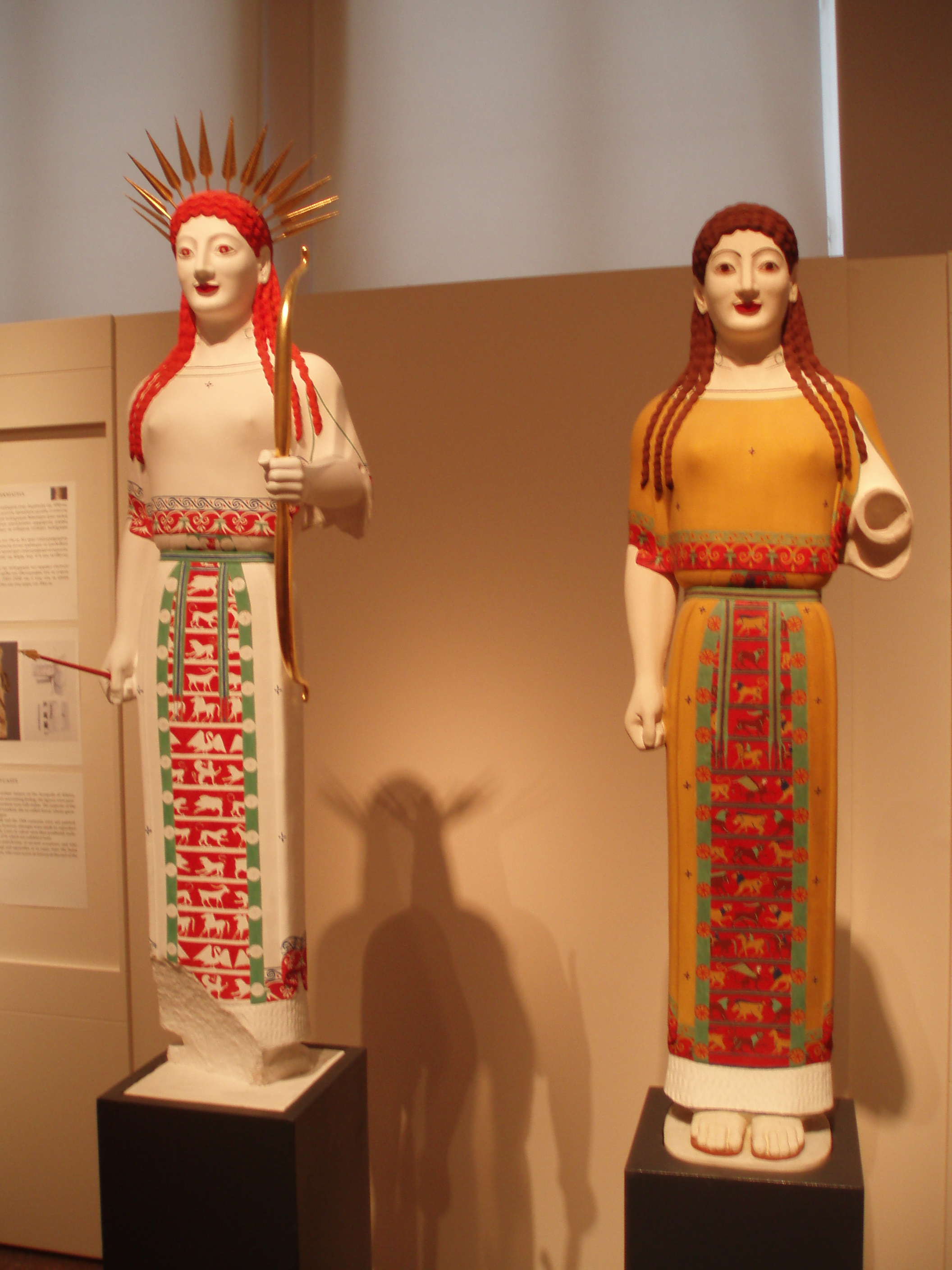
Alternative reconstructions of the Peplos Kore in the Gods in Colour exhibition, at left as Artemis.

A number of similar kore statues (plural korai) have been discovered at the Acropolis, dating to as early as the early 6th century BCE. Some scholars have suggested that those kore statues were commissioned as offerings to worshiped deities, perhaps as votive figures who stand in the place of a patron. Korai also appear in Attic cemeteries as grave markers for deceased women, as was the case for the Phrasikleia Kore. The Peplos Kore has distinct differences from the other discovered kore figures; the work is dressed in a particular manner, leading some archaeologists to suggest that the statue was a depiction of a goddess, or even a sculpted depiction of a wooden cult statue.

The statue is carved in the round, but designed to be seen from the front, with many details, especially in the facial features. The face displays an “archaic smile” similar to many Greek statues from the Archaic period. The kore statues depict young, clothed female figures, in contrast to their male counterparts, the kouros figures, which are presented as muscular nude males.

In 1975, the Museum of Classical Archaeology, Cambridge attempted to replicate the sculpture’s original appearance by painting a cast of the figure. The replica was then displayed next to a second, unpainted cast to demonstrate the difference between the pure white marble that is commonly associated with Greek sculpture and the brightly-painted version that is probably closer to reality. Two further alternative polychromed versions were shown together in the touring Gods in Colour exhibition.

== See also ==
- Polychrome
- Antenor Kore
