= Antenor Kore =

Late Archaic statue from 530-520 BC

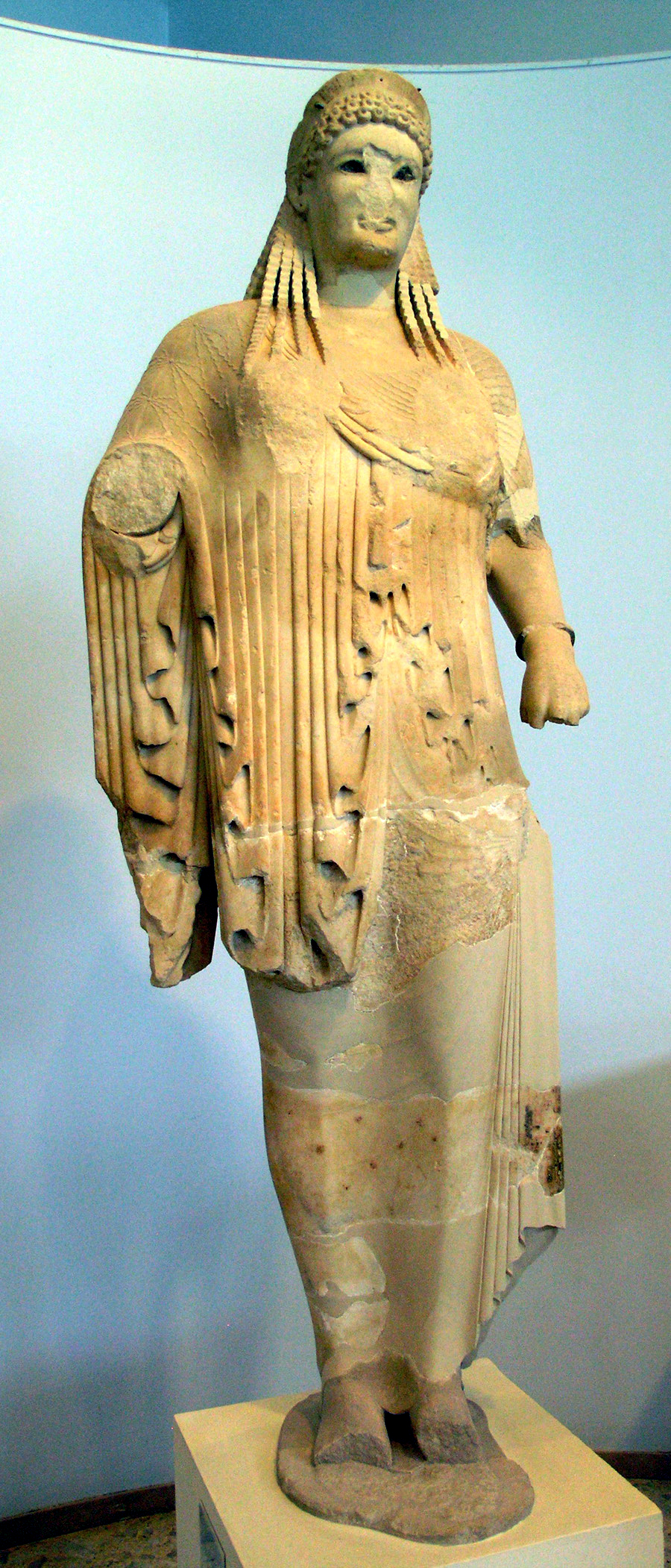
- Antenor Kore
- Type: Kore
- Material: Parian marble
- Created: 530/20 BC
- Discovered: Acropolis of Athens, Attica, Greece
- Place: Acropolis Museum, Athens
- Culture: Archaic Greece

The Antenor Kore is a Late Archaic statue of a girl (Kore) made of Parian marble, which was created around 530/20 BC.

The statue was found in several fragments during excavations on the Athenian Acropolis in the so-called Perserschutt. The lower part and the left arm were dug up east of the Parthenon in 1882 and the upper part was discovered west of the Erechtheion in 1886. Parts of the calf followed. The face is damaged, especially the nose, and the lower right arm is missing, as is the front of the feet on the plinth. The kore was originally located in the Athena sanctuary on the acropolis and is now kept in the Acropolis Museum The statue is 201 cm high, excluding the plinth.

The Kore has chest-length hair, which only partially survives. The hair at the front is gathered into tight curls, while the rest of the hair falls in locks, fanning out over the shoulders and back. She wears a crown in her hair. Like all archaic korai, the sculpture has a clear axis and stares directly at the viewer. She wears a chiton and himation. The latter seems to be tied over the left arm, pinned at the top with a fibula and falling below in omega-folds. With the left hand the image gathers the chiton, causing the characteristic drapery. The conspicuously empty eye-holes must have been inlaid with another material, likely glass - a rather rare feature in marble statues of this period.

Fragments of a Pentelic marble statue base in the form of a capital were found in the Perserschutt in the same excavation as the statue fragments. This base was first connected with the statue by Franz Studniczka, a conclusion which has been largely accepted, though some still doubt. An inscription on the base name the donor Nearchos and the sculptor Antenor son of Eumares. It reads:

English:

Nearchos dedicated this. [The potter] organised the work in Ath[ens].

Antenor ma[de] the [statue], son of Eumares

Ancient Greek:

ΝΕΑΡΧΟΣΑΝΕΘΕΚΕΝ[ΗΟΚΕΡΑΜΕ]- ΥΣΕΡΓΟΝΑΠΑΡΧΕΝΤΑΘ[ΕΝΑΙΑΙ].

ΑΝΤΕΝΟΡΕΠ[ΟΙΕΣΕΝΗ]- ΟΕΥΜΑΡΟΣΤ[ΟΑΓΑΛΜΑ]

The surviving Ancient Greek: ΥΣ at the beginning of the second line is generally restored as Ancient Greek: κεραμεύς and the donor identified with the attested potter Nearchos from the second quarter of the sixth century BC or with an unknown potter of the same name, perhaps a son or uncle of the known Nearchos. It has sometimes been doubted that a simple artesan could be the donor of such a votive statue and alternative restorations of the inscription have been suggested. On the other hand it was quite possible in the 6th century to gain a significant fortune through craftworks and other donations are known from potters and vase painters on the Acropolis.

== Bibliography ==
- Antony E. Raubitschek. Dedications from the Athenian Akropolis. A catalogue of the inscriptions of the sixth and fifth centuries B. C. Archaeological Institute of America, Cambridge, Mass. 1949, pp. 232–233, no. 197.
- Gisela Richter. Korai. Archaic Greek Maides. A Study of the Development of the Kore Type in Greek Sculpture. Phaidon, London 1968, p. 69, no. 110, ill. 336–340.
- Katerina Karakasi. Archaische Koren. Hirmer, München 2001, p. 125. 133 tbl. 148–149. 254–256.
- Sascha Kansteiner, Lauri Lehmann, Bernd Seidensticker, Klaus Stemmer (edd.): Text und Skulptur. Berühmte Bildhauer und Bronzegiesser der Antike in Wort und Bild. De Gruyter, Berlin/New York 2009, ISBN 978-3-11-019610-8, pp. 5–7 (Google Books).
- TonArt. Virtuosität antiker Töpfertechnik. Imhoff, Petersberg 2010, ISBN 978-3-86568-610-7, p. 126–127 no. 92.
