= Brauron =

City of ancient Attica, Greece

- Βραυρών (Ancient Greek); Βραυρώνα (Greek)
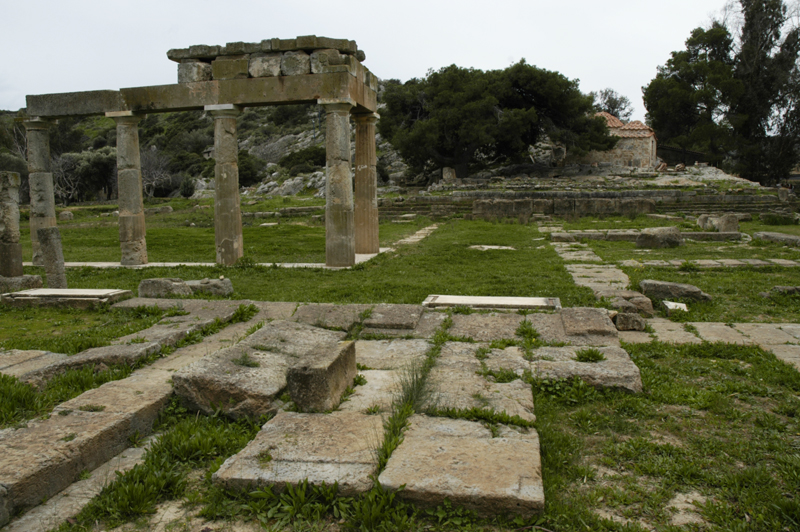
- View of the platform of the temple, looking south across the stoa

- Location within Greece
- 37°55′34″N 23°59′37″E
- Type: Sanctuary
- Periods: Archaic Greek to Hellenistic
- Satellite of: Athens
- Associated with: Pisistratus
- Location: Vravrona, Attica, Greece
- Region: Attica

History
- Built: 8th century BCE
- Abandoned: 3rd century BCE

Site notes
- Condition: Ruined
- Owner: Public
- Management: 2nd Ephorate of Prehistoric and Classical Antiquities
- Public access: Yes
- Website: Hellenic Ministry of Culture and Tourism

Brauron (/ˈbrɔːrɒn/; Ancient Greek: Βραυρών) was one of the twelve cities of ancient Attica, but never mentioned as a deme, though it continued to exist down to the latest times. It was situated on or near the eastern coast of Attica, between Steiria and Halae Araphenides, near the river Erasinus. Brauron is celebrated on account of the worship of Artemis Brauronia, in whose honor a festival was celebrated in this place. This site includes the remains of a temple, a stoa (colonnaded walkway), and a theatre, providing insights into the religious practices and social life of ancient Greece. Its significance as a religious and cultural site can be further understood through the exploration of its archeological remains and historical accounts.

== History ==
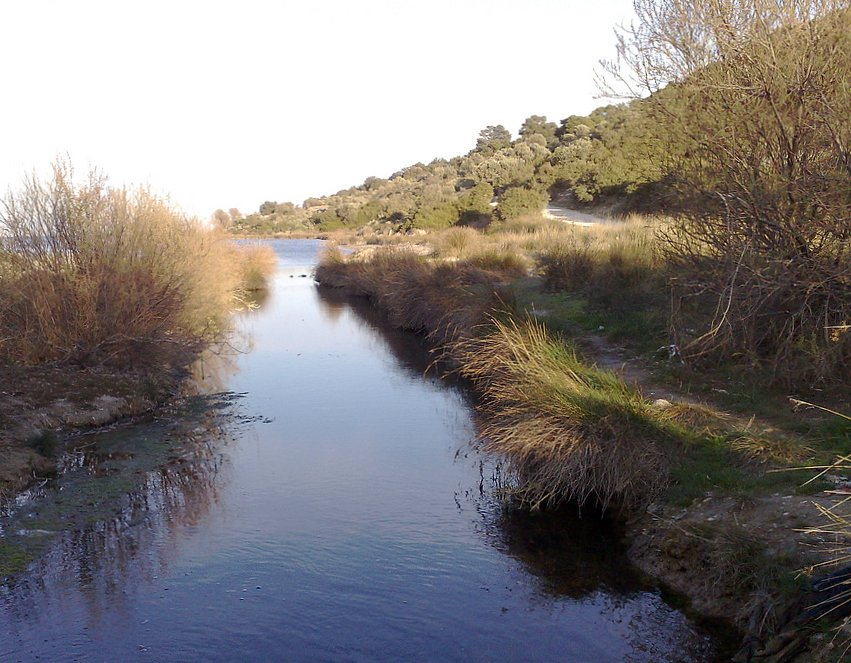
Erasinos River near the Temple of Artemis Brauronia

In the 420s BCE, there was a period of significant architectural activity at the site, including the addition of the Π-shaped stoa, the bridge, and reconstruction work on the temple. Since Artemis was connected in myth to both plague and healing — as was her brother Apollo — it may be that this activity was taken as a result of the plague that struck Athens in this period. The unfortified site continued in use until the 3rd century BCE, when tensions between Athens and the Macedonians caused it to be abandoned, perhaps after the site was damaged in a flood. In the 2nd century CE the periegetic writer Pausanias has uncharacteristically little to say concerning the Sanctuary at Brauron or its mythology/history, but what he does relate contradicts Euripides:

Brauron is some way from Marathon, they say that Iphigenia, the daughter of Agamemnon, having fled from the Taurians bearing an image of Artemis made landfall at this place. They say that she left the image here and went herself to Athens and then later to Argos. This xoanon (wooden image) of Artemis was ancient, but I will reveal just who — in my personal opinion — has the one taken from the Barbarians in another discussion. Description of Greece 1.33.1

The site was preserved from dilapidation by the silting of the nearby Erasinos river; however, a Christian basilica was built in the 6th century CE on the other side of the valley using spoliated material from the sanctuary. After that time, no archaeologically significant activity occurred at the site until the erection of a small church dedicated to Hagios Georgios in the 15th century CE was erected immediately adjacent to the temple platform on the southwest side, perhaps on the remains of a small shrine.

== Mythology ==
As the Greek fleet was preparing to sail to Troy to force the return of Helen, they gathered in Aulis near the Euripus Strait. While there, king Agamemnon killed a stag sacred to the goddess Artemis. The enraged deity caused a contrary wind and eventually forced the king to agree to sacrifice his daughter Iphigeneia in order to ensure a favorable wind for the Greek fleet. In one version of the myth, a surrogate sacrifice was provided through the divine intervention of Artemis, and the saved girl then became a priestess of the goddess among the Tauri, a people living near the Black Sea in the Crimean peninsula. Subsequent to these events, Iphigenia returns from among the Tauri with the assistance of her brother Orestes. In Euripides' version of the myth, the goddess Athena reveals that Iphigenia will make landfall in Brauron and there be the priestess of Artemis, die, and be buried:

ATHENA:

And Orestes, learn well my commands – for you hear

the voice of the goddess although you are not present –

set forth taking the (sacred) image and your sister,

and when you reach god-built Athens,

there is a place on the outermost borders

of Attica, a neighbor of the Karustia ridge,

sacred, and my people name it Halai.

Build a temple there and set up the wooden image

– named for the Tauric land and for your struggles,

which you endured wandering through Greece

due to the goads of the Furies. And in the future mortals

shall sing hymns to the goddess Artemis Tauropolos.

And set up this law: whenever the people keep the festival

as a payment of your sacrifice, hold a sword

at a man's throat and draw blood,

so that by this the goddess may have her holy honors.

And you, Iphigenia, beside the holy stairs

of Brauron you must hold the keys for the goddess herself:

where you will die and be buried, and – as a delight for you –

they will dedicate the finely woven material of woven cloth

which by chance women having lost their lives in childbirth

abandon in their homes. I command you to send forth

these Greek women from this land

due to their correct intentions.

Euripides, Iphigeneia in Tauris 1446–1468.

The poet asserts a close connection between the nearby sanctuary of Artemis Tauropolos at Halai (modern day Loutsa) and the Sanctuary at Brauron, where Iphigenia is to receive honors in the cult of Artemis. As is often the case, there were multiple competing versions of the relevant myths, but the mythical connection between the three coastal sanctuaries of Artemis is clear. Halai Araphenides (the Salt Fields of Araphen, modern Rafina) was the ancient name of modern Loutsa, a beach resort half-way between Rafina and Vravrona, where the ruins of a small temple to Artemis Tauropolos have been excavated from underneath the sand dunes originally covering the area.

== Sanctuary of Artemis at Brauron ==
The sanctuary of Artemis at Brauron (Modern Greek: Βραυρώνα - Vravrona) is an early sacred site on the eastern coast of Attica near the Aegean Sea in a small inlet. The inlet has silted up since ancient times, pushing the current shoreline farther from the site. A nearby hill, c. 24 m high and 220 m to the southeast, was inhabited during the Neolithic era, c. 2000 BCE, and flourished particularly from Middle Helladic to early Mycenaean times (2000–1600 BCE) as a fortified site (acropolis). Occupation ceased in the LHIIIb period, and the acropolis was never significantly resettled after this time. This gap in the occupation of the site lasted from LHIIIb (13th century) until the 8th century BCE. Brauron was one of the twelve ancient settlements of Attica prior to the synoikismos of Theseus, who unified them with Athens.

The following of Artemis Brauronia connected the coastal (rural) sanctuary at Brauron with another (urban) sanctuary on the acropolis in Athens, the Brauroneion, from which there was a procession every four years during the Arkteia festival. The tyrant Pisistratus was Brauronian by birth, and he is credited with transferring the cult to the Acropolis, thus establishing it on the statewide rather than local level. The sanctuary contained a small temple of Artemis, a unique stone bridge, cave shrines, a sacred spring, and a pi-shaped (Π) stoa that included dining rooms for ritual feasting. The unfortified site continued in use until tensions between the Athenians and the Macedonians the 3rd century BCE caused it to be abandoned. After that time, no archaeologically significant activity occurred at the site until the erection of a small church in the 6th century CE.

Votive dedications at the sanctuary include a number of statues of young children of both sexes, as well as many items pertaining to feminine life, such as jewelry boxes and mirrors. Large numbers of miniature kraters (krateriskoi) have been recovered from the site, many depicting young girls — either nude or clothed — racing or dancing. The Archaeological Museum of Brauron — located around a small hill 330 m to the ESE — contains an extensive and important collection of finds from the site throughout its period of use.

=== Archaeology of the sanctuary ===
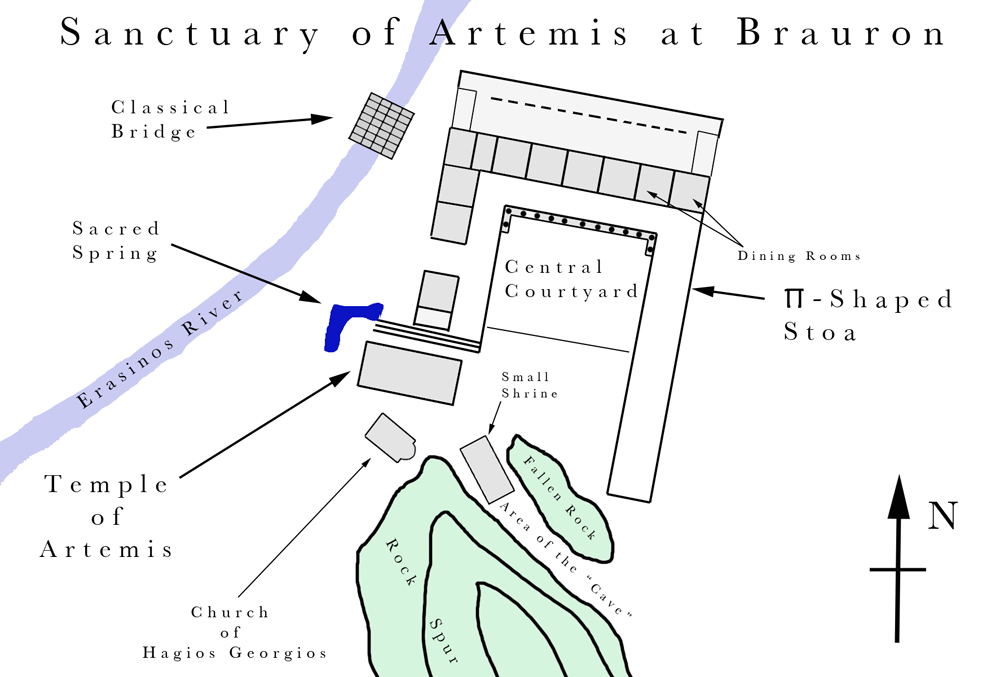
Labelled plan of the Sanctuary of Artemis at Brauron

In 1948, John Papadimitriou began excavating this site; he continued, with interruptions, until his death in 1963. Charalambos Bouras continued the restoration during the 1950s to 1962. Among the fifth-century monuments are the Π-shaped stoa around the interior courtyard, opening toward the temple of Artemis; the small temple (perhaps a heroon of Iphigeneia); and the stone bridge over the Erasinos River. Building repair inscriptions from the site list many more structures than have been recovered to this point, including a palaestra and a gymnasion.

==== Temple of Artemis ====
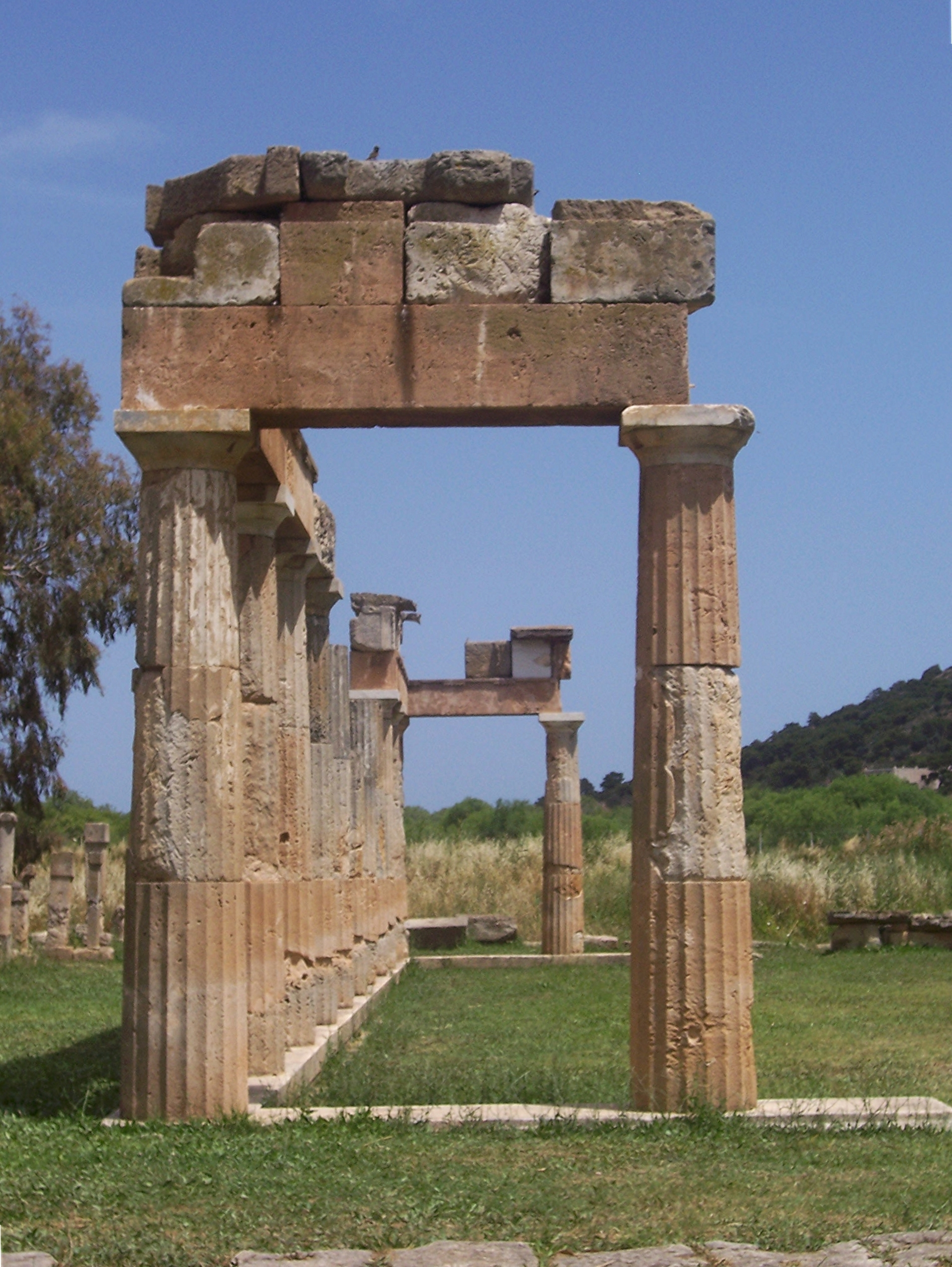
The Π-shaped stoa

The first known temple at the sanctuary — dating to the late 6th century BCE — rests on a low rock spur south of the river and is aligned toward the east on a foundation measuring c. 11 by 20 m. Little is preserved beyond partial lower courses and cuttings in the bedrock for the same. There are a few remains of the architecture that allow a certain identification of the temple as being of the Doric order. The Persians destroyed the sanctuary structures in 480 BCE and took the cult statue back to Susa. The temple was reconstructed in the 420s BCE. Although the temple is poorly preserved, it can be reconstructed to have had four columns in the cella and an adyton at the rear of the cella. The presence of an adyton is asserted for the temple of Artemis at Loutsa (Artemida) 6.1 km to the north and the temple of Artemis at Aulis 67 km northwest. This feature may also be shared by the 6th century BCE Temple of Aphaea on Aigina. Schwandner links the shared feature of an adyton with a common, regional practice in the cult of Artemis. There is disagreement on the question of the temple having been hexastyle-prostyle (six columns across the front only) or distyle in antis (two columns between projecting walls) in plan. There is a stepped retaining wall on the northern side of the temple platform, which may be the steps mentioned by Euripides.

==== Π-shaped stoa ====
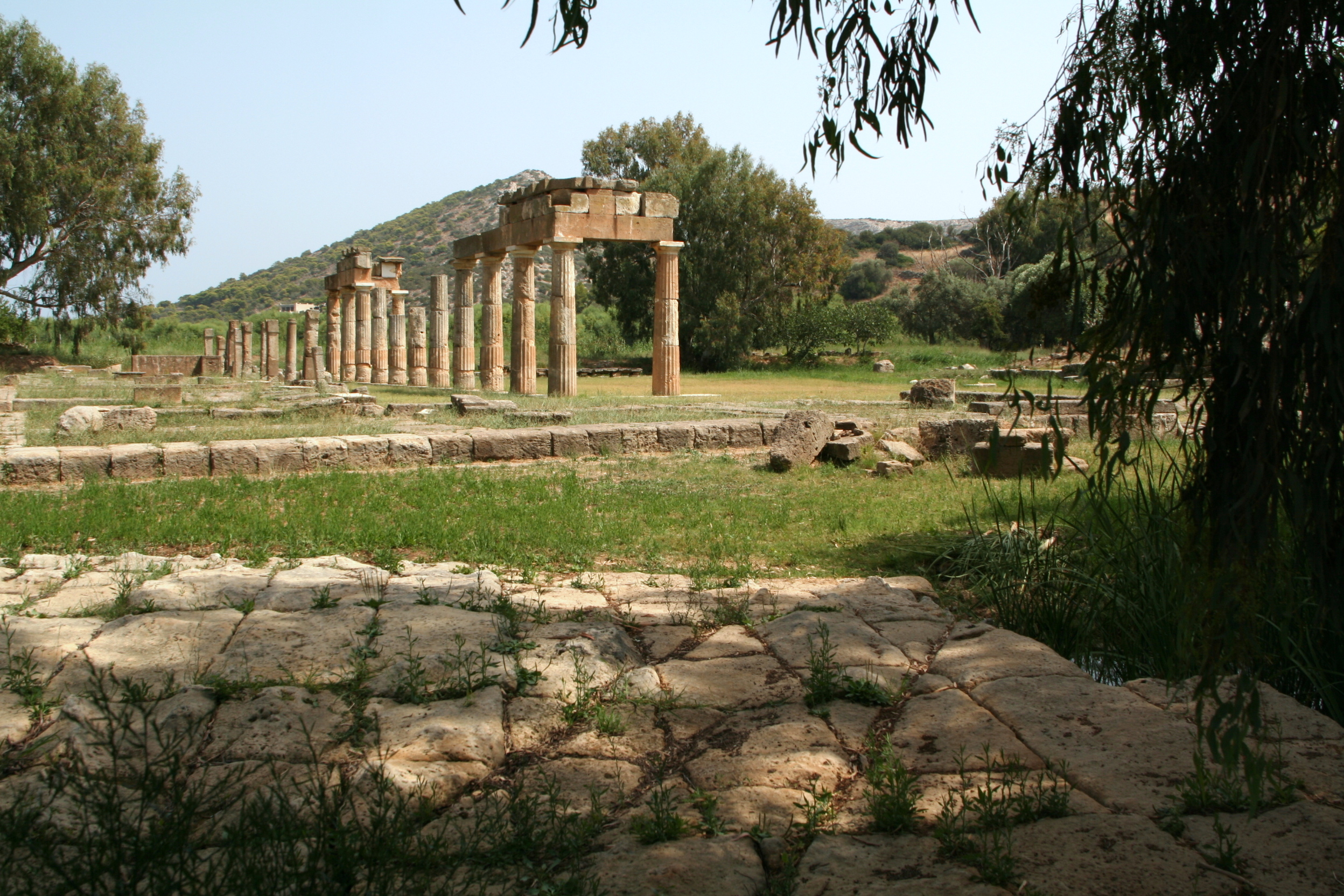
Π-shaped stoa, facing south toward the Temple of Artemis Brauronia

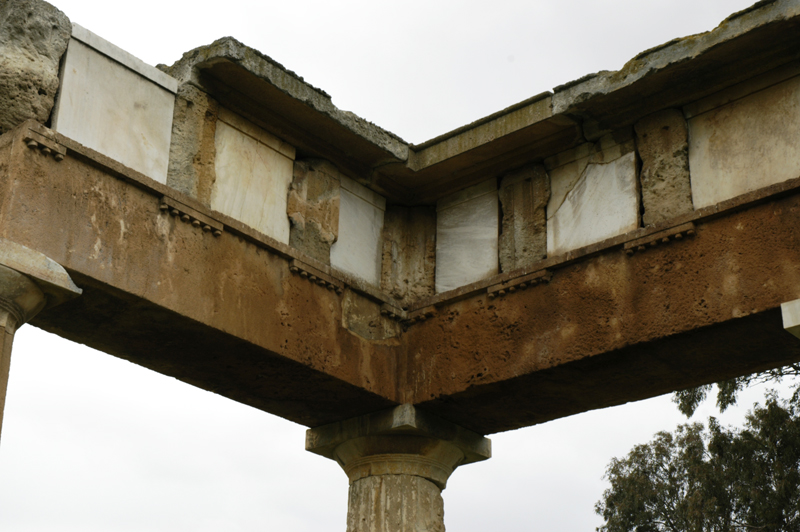
Doric frieze of the stoa showing marble metopes

The Doric stoa wrapped around three sides of a central courtyard (20 by 27 m) and faced south toward the temple of Artemis. The foundations extend along the west wing for 38 m, the north wing for 48 m, and the east wing for 63 m. Only the north colonnade of the stoa (11 columns) and one column of each of the two wings were completed. Behind the colonnade, there was a passageway containing many votive stelae (some with votive statues of children at top) and doorways into nine roughly square rooms (c. 5.5 by 5.5 m) on the north and west sides of the structure.

These doorways were off-center relative to the rooms, each of which had raised platforms extending from all sides. On these platforms are many cuttings (some still containing lead) designed to hold dining couches — eleven couches for each dining room. Some of the rooms preserve small stone tables situated in front of the location of the couches. These structures are among the most paradigmatic examples of Greek dining rooms known. The walls of these rooms were constructed of a single course of massive limestone ashlar blocks that have no cuttings on their upper surfaces. The walls were thus completed in mud brick to the level of the roof. On the western side of the stoa there was an entrance with wheel ruts worn into the stone floor and in line with the Classical bridge.

The stoa was built of local limestone covered in marble stucco, except for the Doric capitals, the metopes, the lintels, and the thresholds, which were produced from marble. A highly atypical feature of this design was the use of two triglyphs in the inter-columnar interval as opposed to the typical single triglyph. This was done to lower the total height of the entablature while allowing the metopes to remain square in form. In addition, the returning angles of the frieze demanded the architectural accommodation of corner expansion (as opposed to the corner contraction seen on many temples) to harmonize the intervals of the triglyphs, which could not be placed dead center over the corner column.

Immediately north of the stoa and sharing a common wall was a structure of unknown function with elaborate entrances on both west and east sides. On its long axis it measured 48 m (equivalent to the stoa) and was c. 11 m wide. Along the northern wall of this structure there was a series of slotted bases for narrow (perhaps wooden) planks; these planks are hypothesized to have held the garments dedicated to Iphegenia, as discussed by Euripides.

==== Stone bridge ====
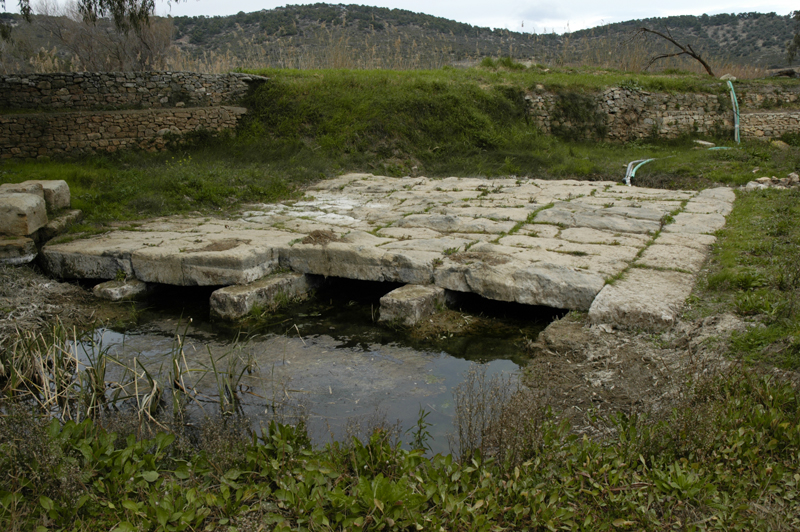
The classical period stone bridge with wheel ruts

This stone bridge is the only known example of a Classical period bridge in Greece. It uses the standard post and lintel construction of its time, rather than arches as later bridges do. It measured c. 9 m wide with a span of c. 8 m that consisted of four rows of lintel blocks resting on five rows of posts (the two end points and three intermediate supports). Wheel ruts are cut into the stones of the bridge at an oblique angle toward a simple entrance on the west side of the stoa; these cuttings do not go toward the elaborate propylon (monumental entranceway) of the structure north of the stoa as might seem more likely. This bridge introduced a new type of construction wherein horizontal stone slabs are supported by a series of walls parallel to the stream, which flows through the narrow channels between the walls.

==== Sacred spring ====
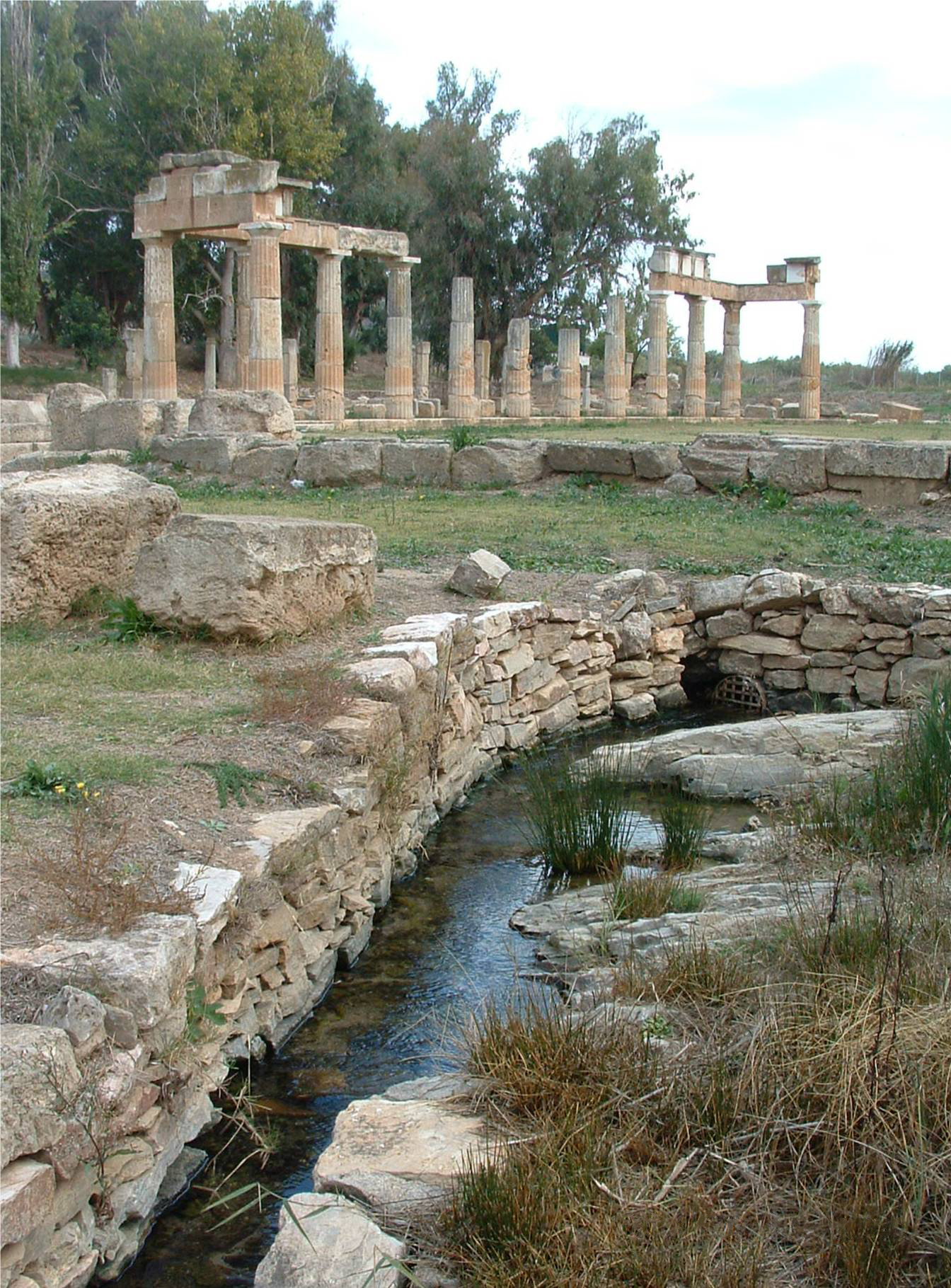
The stoa and the sacred spring from the southwest

A spring emerged from the northwest end of the rock spur running down from the acropolis hill to the southeast of the site. This spring was the focus of cult activity from the 8th century BCE forward. The first activity on the site known after the Bronze Age is thus linked to cultic practice at this spring. Dedications were made by throwing objects into this sacred spring, which was located immediately northwest of the later temple platform.

==== Small shrine ====
About 12 m southeast of the Temple of Artemis a small shrine (Μικρὸν ἱερόν) of c. 5.5 by 8 m was built into the space between the face of the rock spur and a mass of fallen rock measuring 25 m in length. The c. 6 m wide space between the face of the rock spur and the fallen rock is densely packed with structural remains of uncertain function. This area has been associated with the propitiation of Iphigenia, perhaps in the form of a heroon. It is probable that some of these structures were in place before the rock fall, and it is possible that the small shrine replaced a cult site (perhaps for Iphigenia) destroyed by the collapse of the rock overhang under which it was built. The area between the face of the rock spur and the fallen rock has been termed a “cave” in some publications. There is another cave higher on the rock, approximately over the entrance to the archaeological site. This was converted into a makeshift chapel of St. George, possibly several centuries ago.

=== Additional images of the Sanctuary of Artemis at Brauron ===
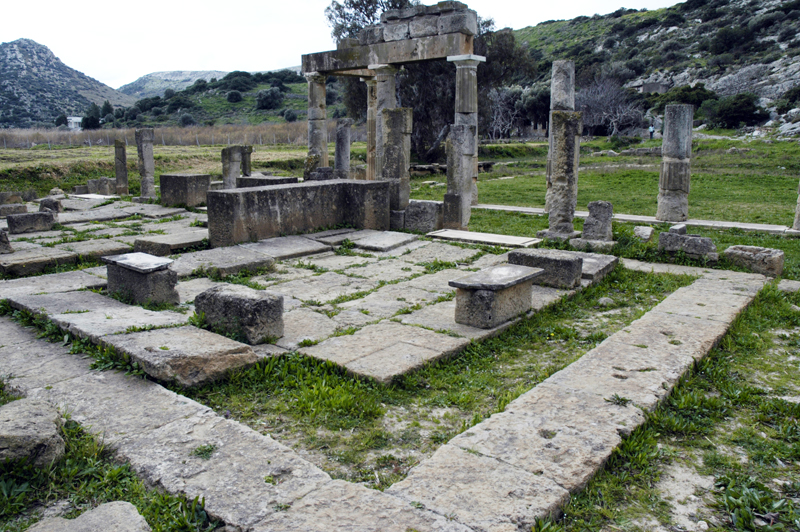
The remains of a dining room with tables

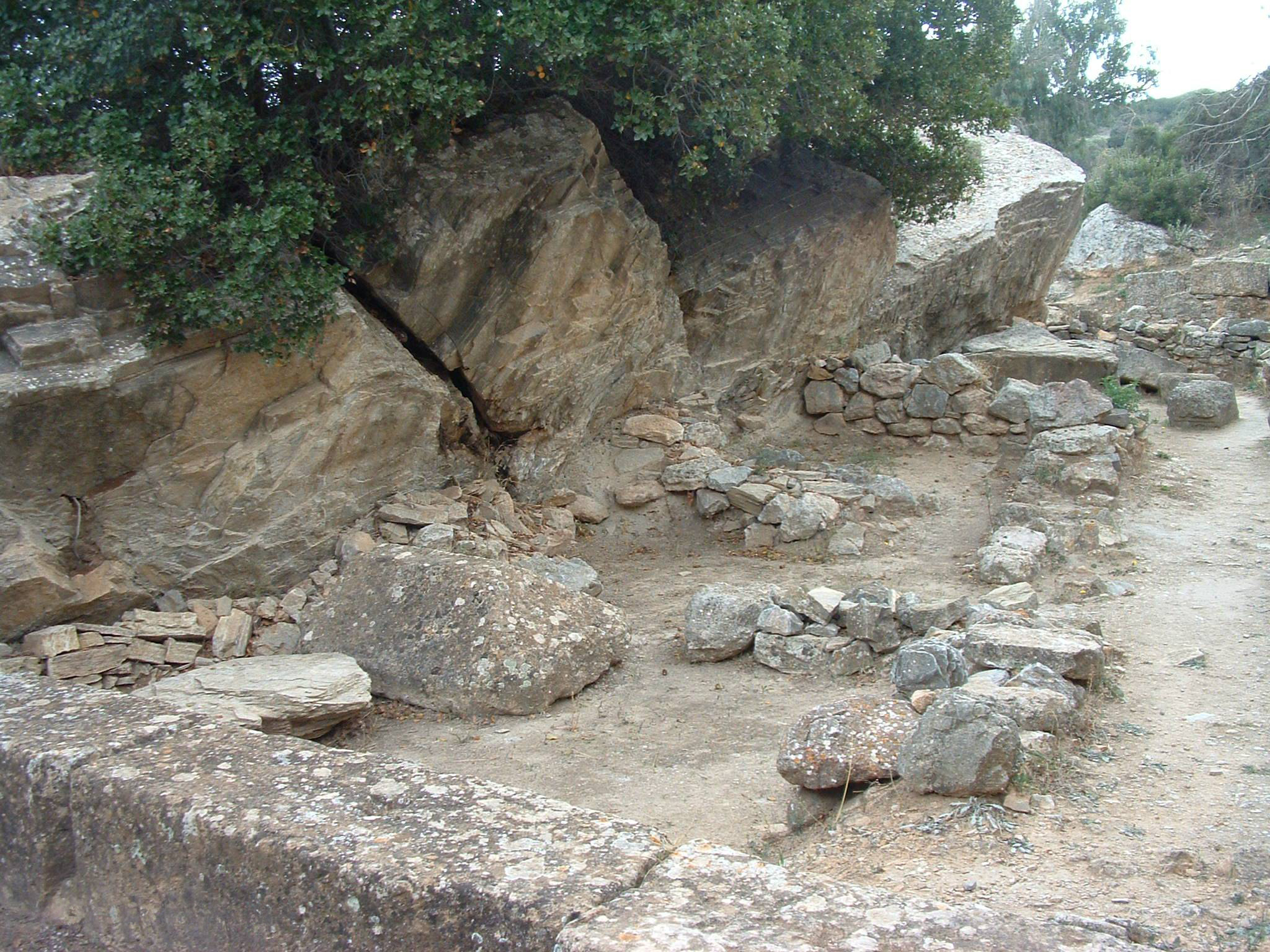
The “cave” that may have functioned as the Heroon of Iphigeneia

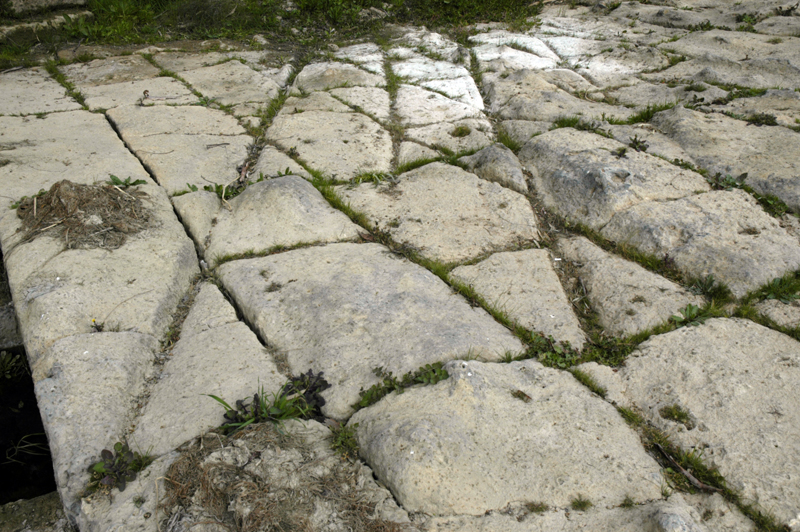
A closer look at wheel ruts on the classical bridge

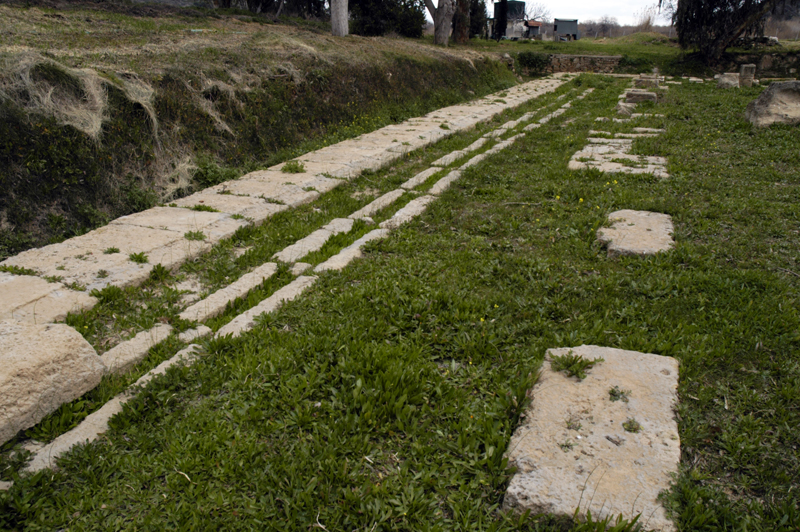
The series of slotted bases in the building north of the stoa

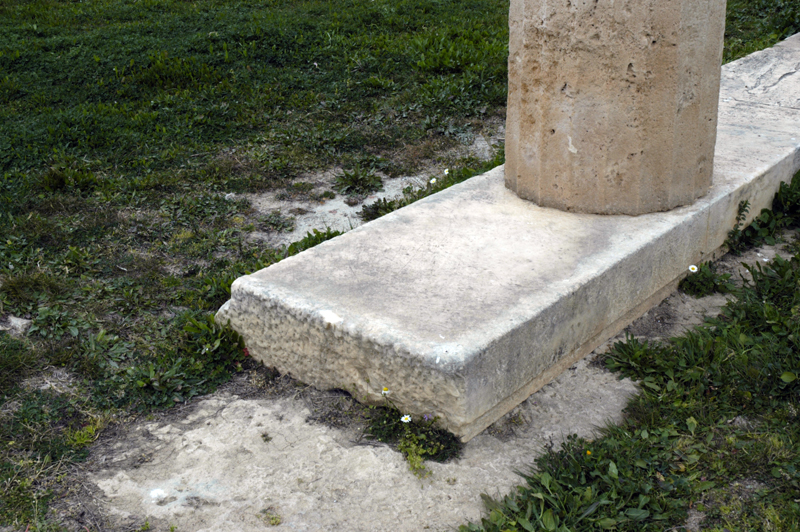
Stylobate of the west wind on the stoa; the lack of anathyrosis indicates it never extended further

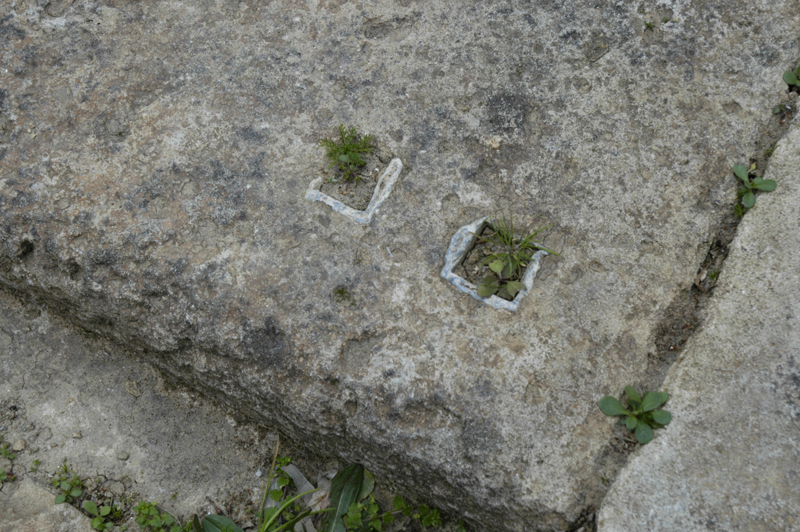
Cuttings in the raised platforms in the dining rooms for the legs of couches. The lead used to secure the legs is visible.

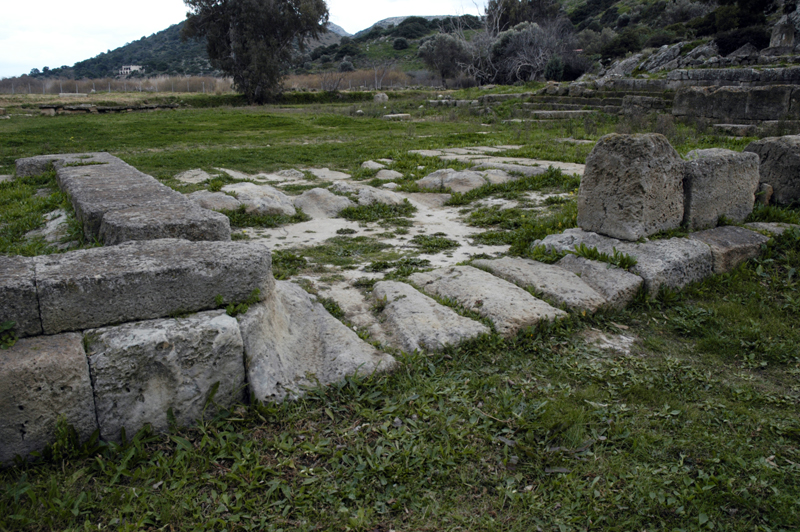
Wheel ruts in the western entrance to the stoa

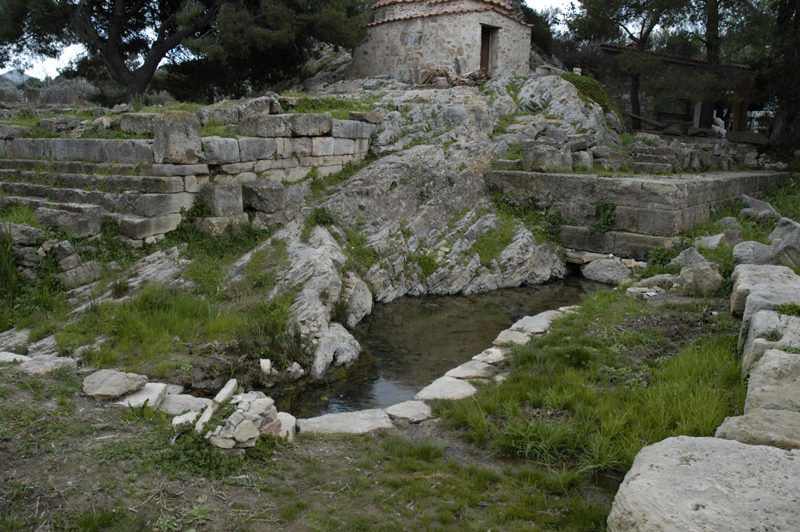
The pool of the sacred spring with the stepped retaining wall (left), the temple podium and the church of Hagios Georgios at center

== Cult of Artemis Brauronia ==
Cult activity is known from the 8th century BCE forward from dedications in the sacred spring, and a temple was built in the 6th century BCE.

The Arkteia festival was celebrated every four years and involved a procession from the shrine of Artemis Brauronia on the acropolis of Athens, 24.5 km WNW of the sanctuary. At the isolated sanctuary of Artemis at Brauron, young Athenian girls approaching marriageable age formed groups consecrated for a time to Artemis as arktoi, she-bears, and spent their time in sacred dances, wearing honey-colored saffron robes, running races and making sacrifice. Vase paintings show that cultic nudity was an element in these preparations for womanhood. An epigram in the Anthologia Graeca concerns the offerings of childish playthings a nubile young girl dedicates to Artemis on the eve of marriage; many such tokens have been recovered from the spring at Brauron. There may have been joint worship of Iphegenia associated with a cult site, or heroon that may have been located in the “cave” between the face of the rock spur and the fallen rock. The goddess Artemis was a danger to be propitiated by women during child-birth and of the newborn: to her were dedicated the clothes of women who had successfully borne a child. The garments of women who died in childbirth were dedicated to Iphigeneia at Brauron.

== Brauron ==
=== Brauron Signal Tower ===
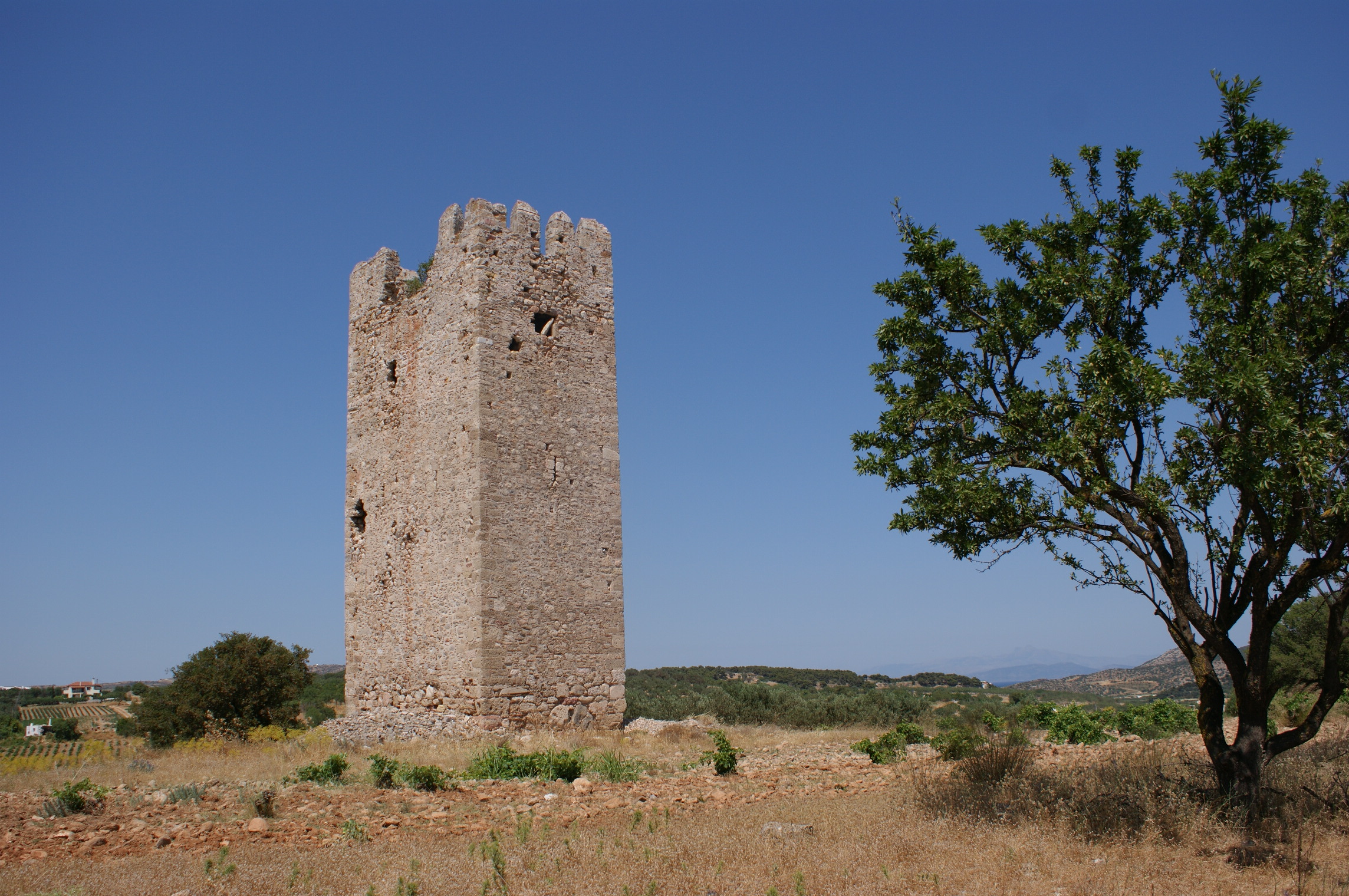
Vravrona Signal Tower, one of the few fortification works remaining from the Frankish rule in the Mesogeia region

The tower was within optical range of other similar towers used for signalling with smoke during the day and fire during the night. Messages could be relayed very quickly and it is said that a message could be transferred from the shores of Asia to the shores of Europe within an hour. The towers of Vravron as well as Liada were also used to signal the appearance of pirates to the residents of the region. Local lore suggests that the tower was of Venetian origin between 1394 and 1405, but archeological investigations show that it was probably built by the Burgundian Dukes De La Roche (1204–1311) at least one hundred years earlier.

=== Modern Brauron ===
The modern Brauron, known as Vravrona, is a tiny settlement of Markopoulo located nearly 1 km southeast of the archaeological site. It contains dozens of homes; the population in 2011 was 195. The urban area lies about 200 m northward and is linked with a road between Markopoulo and Artemis (Loutsa). The town never grew because the adjacent gulf of Vravrona is rocky and not suited to swimming. The area, amply watered by the seasonal Erasinos river, was once famous for its tomatoes and figs. The locally grown batala tomato varietal is considered the best in Greece: it is sweet, very flavorful, very large and fleshy, and consequently very heavy. This spelled the varietal's commercial doom, as the fruit cannot be stored at all because it collapses under its own weight within a few days after picking. It was only sold at roadside stands by local farmers. Nowadays batala tomatoes are found only in home gardens. The Vravrona or "royal" figs are also very large, sweet, with a thin, light green skin even when fully ripe. They are also practically impossible to store, and furthermore they grow so large that, as soon as they are perfectly ripe, their underside starts bursting apart. This means they are commercially non-viable and their cultivation is restricted to home orchards.

== Nearby places ==
- Artemida (Loutsa), to the north, also has a temple of Artemis beside the shore
- Limani Mesogeias (most known as Porto Rafti), south
- Markopoulo Mesogeias, southwest

== Archaeological museum ==
The museum is about a 5-minute walk from the archaeological site. It was renovated in 2009 and the exhibits were rearranged.

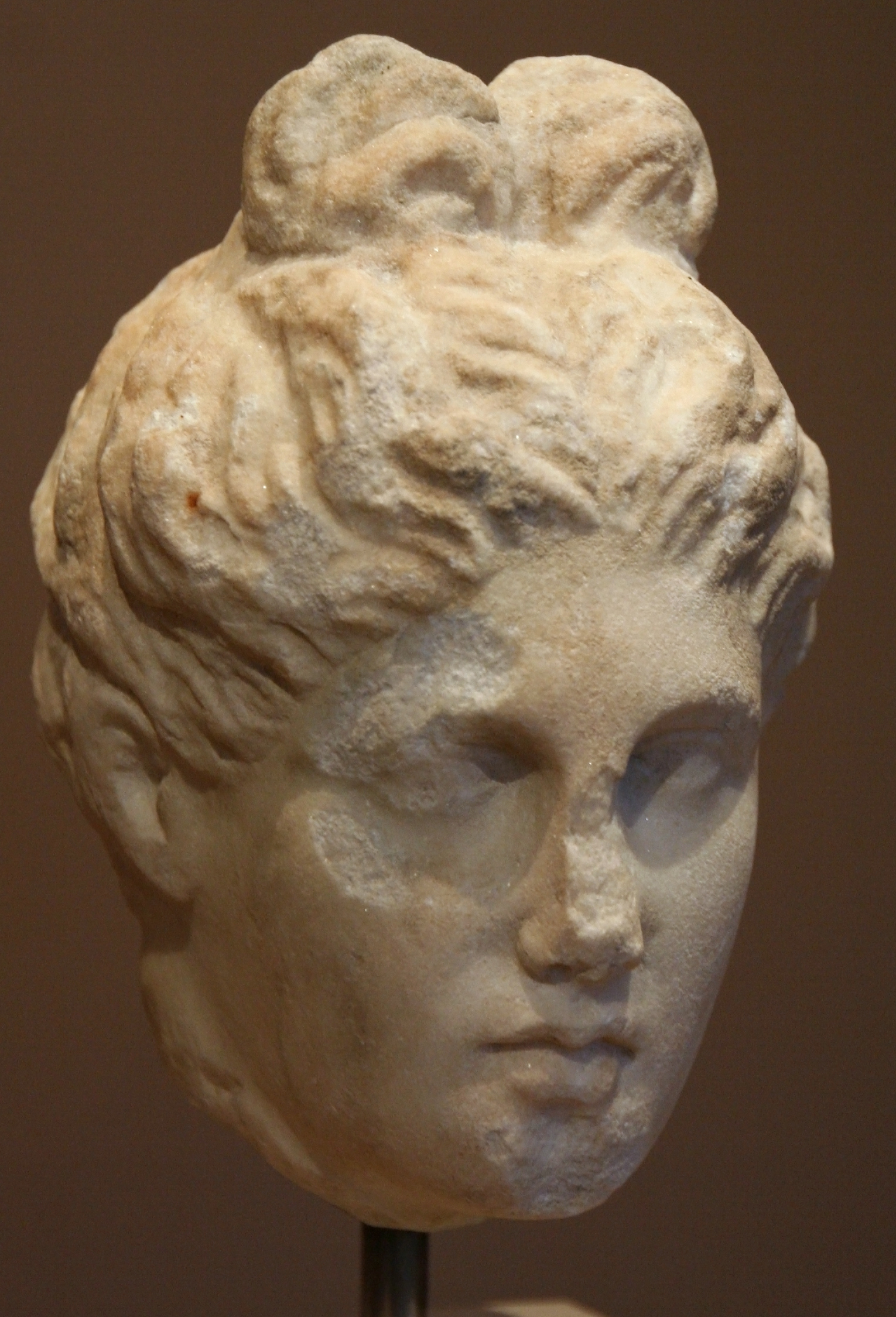
Head of Artemis

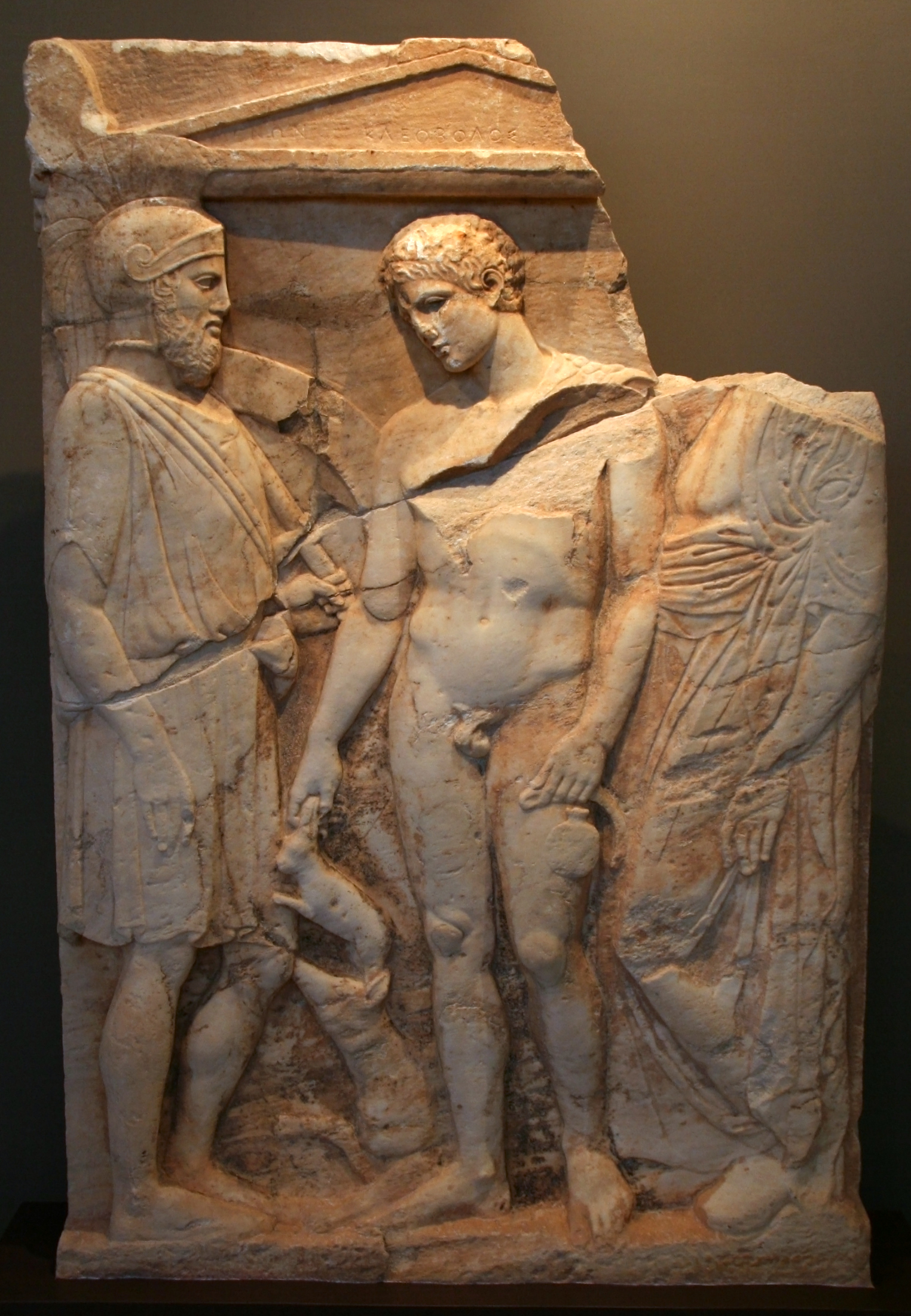
Grave stele

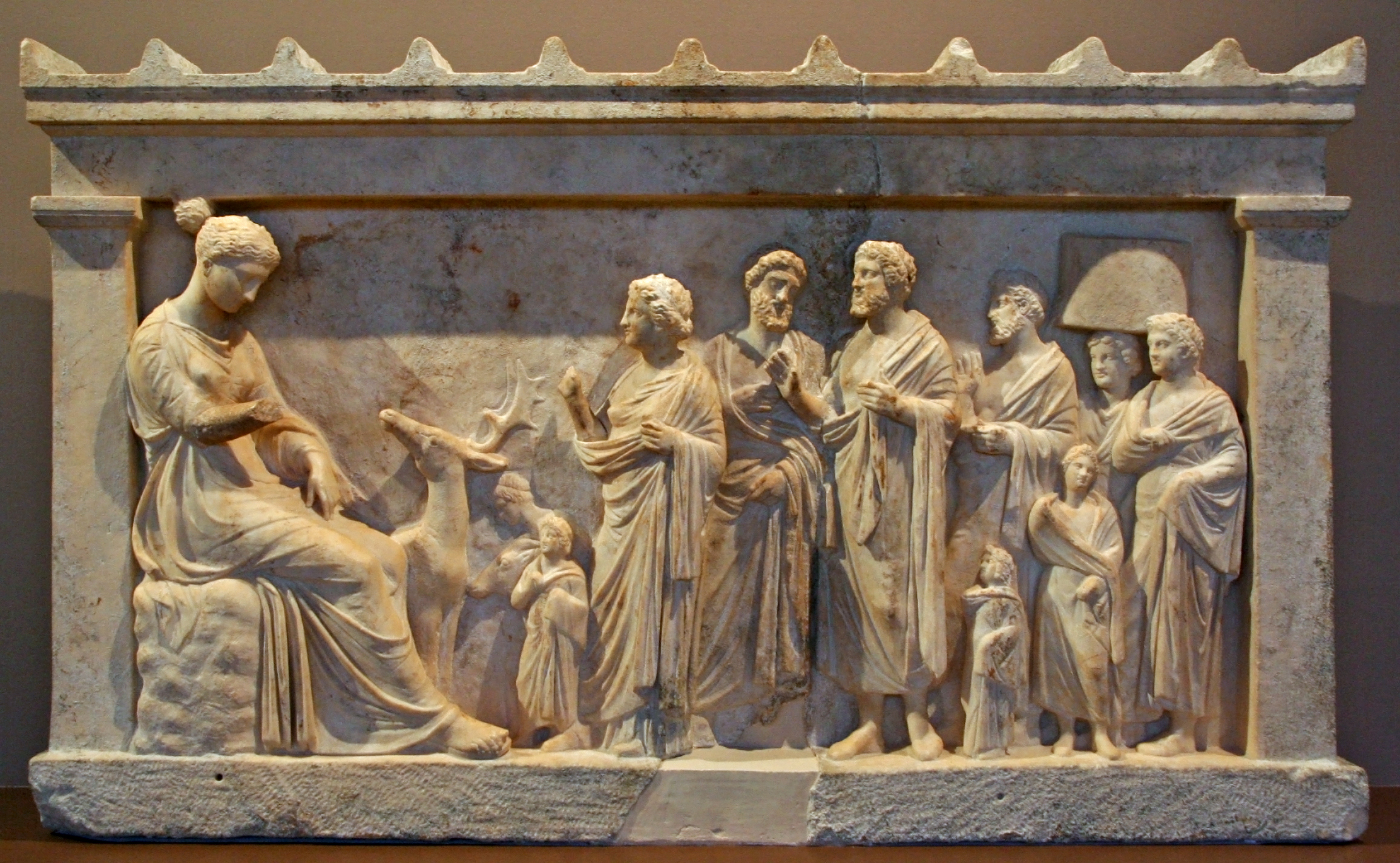
Votive relief

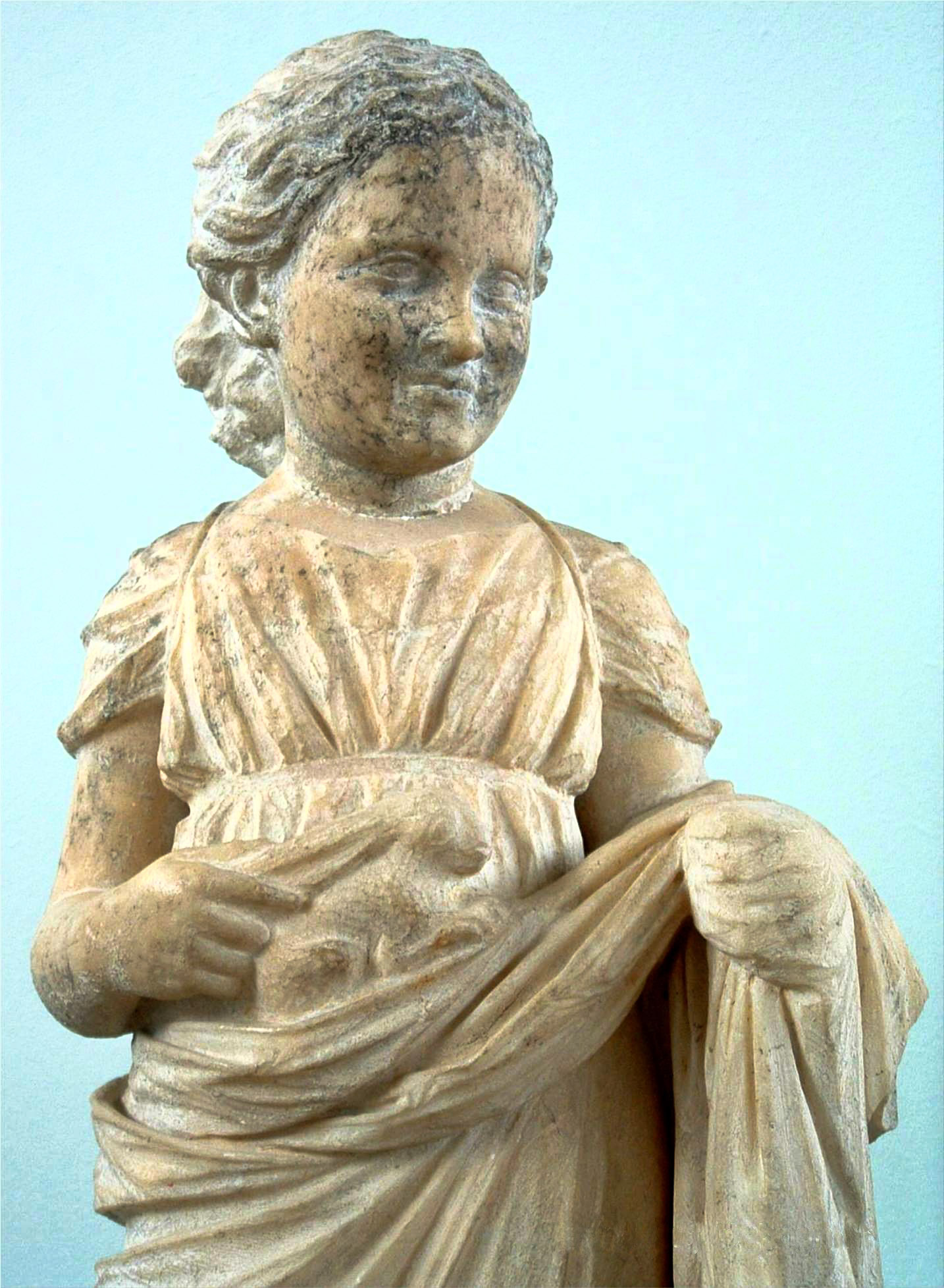
A marble votive statue

== See also ==
- List of ancient Greek cities

== Bibliography ==
- Burkert, Walter. 1985. Greek Religion. Cambridge: Harvard University Press.
- Cleland, Liza (2005). The Brauron clothing catalogues : text, analysis, glossary and translation. Oxford: British Archaeological Reports. ISBN 978-1841717197.
- Cole, Susan Guettel. 2004. "Domesticating Artemis." In Landscapes, Gender, and Ritual Space: the Ancient Greek Experience. Berkeley: University of California Press.
- Cosi, Dario M. (2001). L'arkteia di Brauron e i culti femminili. Bologna.
- Despinis, Giorgos (2010). Ἄρτεμις Βραυρωνία: Λατρευτικά ἀγάλματα καί ἀναθήματα ἀπό τά ἱερά τῆς θεᾶς στή Βραυρώνα καί τήν Ἀκρόπολη τῆς Ἀθήνας. Athens: Archaeological Society of Athens. ISBN 978-960-8145-82-5.
- Ekroth, Gunnel. 2003. "Inventing Iphigeneia? On Euripides and the Cultic Construction of Brauron." Kernos 16: 59–118.
- Fowler, Robert. 1995. "Greek Magic, Greek Religion." Illinois Classical Studies, 20, 1-22.
- Guarisco, Diana (2015). Santuari "gemelli" di una divinità : Artemide in Attica (Primaizione ed.). Bologna. ISBN 978-8869230226.
- Linders, Tullia (1972). Studies in the Treasure Records of Artemis Brauronia Found in Athens. P. Åström. ISBN 978-91-85086-02-3.
- Lundgreen, Birte. 2009. "Boys at Brauron." In From Artemis to Diana: The Goddess of Man and Beast. Acta hyperborea 12. Copenhagen: Museum Tusculanum Press, University of Copenhagen. 117–126.
- McInerney, Jeremy. 2015. ""There will be blood...": The Cult of Artemis Tauropolos at Halai Araphenides. In Cities called Athens: Studies Honoring John McK. Camp II. Edited by Kevin F. Daly and Lee Ann Riccardi. Bucknell University Press.
- Mitsopoulos-Leon, Veronika (2009). Βραυρών: die Tonstatuetten aus dem Heiligtum der Artemis Brauronia : die frühen Statuetten 7. bis 5. Jh. v. Chr. Athens: Archäologische Gesellschaft zu Athen. ISBN 9789608145771.
- Nielsen, Inge. 2009. "The Sanctuary of Artemis Brauronia: Can Architecture and Iconography Help to Locate the Settings of the Rituals ? From Artemis to Diana: The Goddess of Man and Beast. Acta hyperborea 12. Copenhagen: Museum Tusculanum Press, University of Copenhagen. 83-116.
- Sourvinou-Inwood, Christiane. 1988. Studies in Girls’ Transitions: Aspects of the Arkteia and Age Representation in Attic Iconography. Athens, Greece: Kardamitsa.
- Scanlon, Thomas F. 2002. "Race or Chase of The Bears at Brauron?" In Eros and Greek Athletics. Oxford: Oxford University Press.
- Schwandner, Ernst-Ludwig. 1985. Der ältere Porostempel der Aphaia auf Aegina. Berlin: W. de Gruyter.
- Venit, Marjorie Susan. 2003. "A Reconsideration of the 'Relief of the Gods' from Brauron." Antike Kunst 46: 44-55.
- Vikela, Evgenia. 2008. "Artemis: The Worship of Artemis in Attica: Cult Places, Rites, Iconography." InWorshiping Women: Ritual and Reality in Classical Athens. Edited by Nikolaos Kaltsas and Alan Shapiro. New York: Alexander S. Onassis Public Benefit Foundation (USA).
