= Archaeological Museum of Brauron =

Museum in Greece

Coordinates: 37.9244°N 23.9969°E

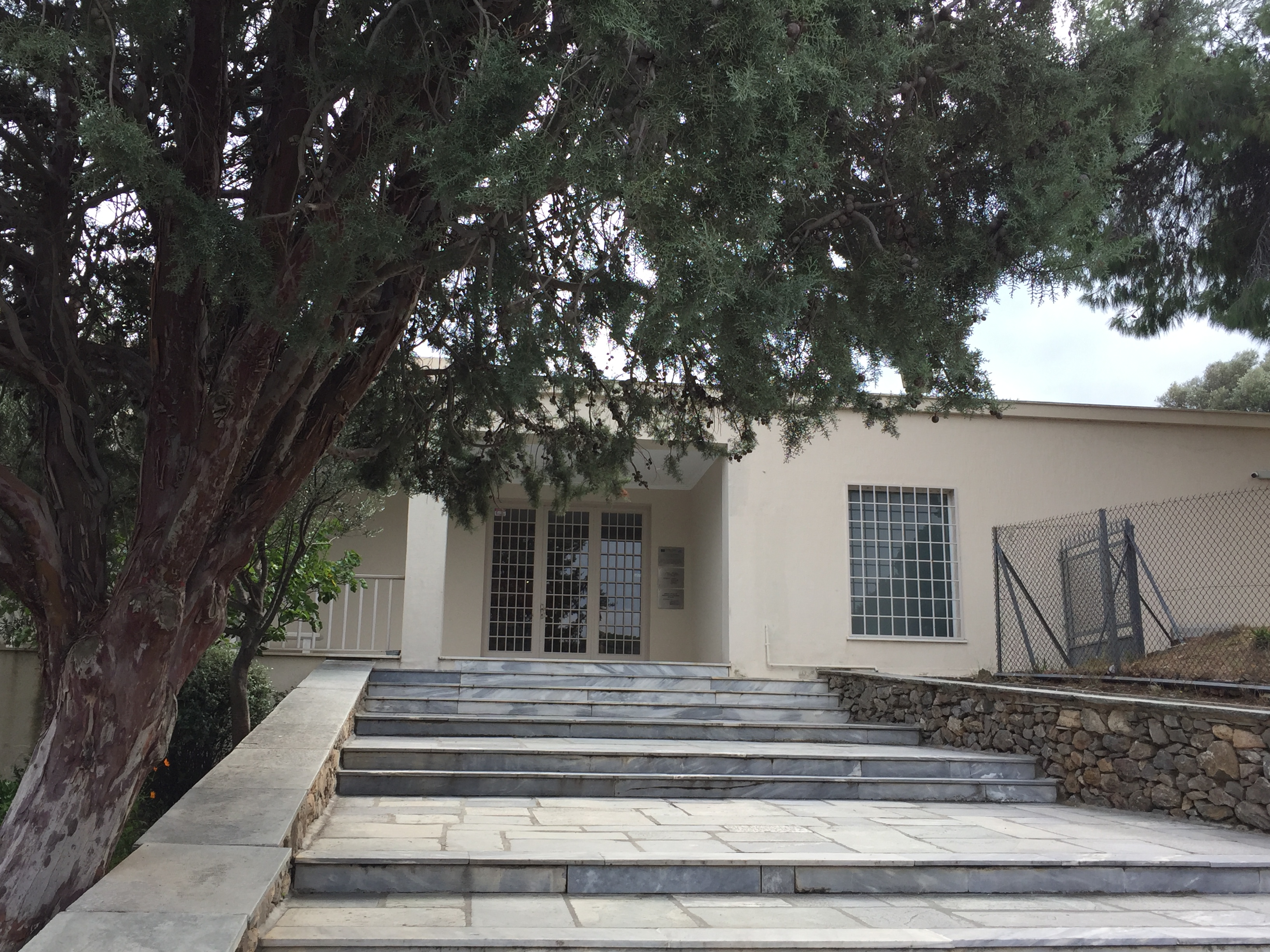
View of the entrance of the museum

The Brauron Archaeological Museum is a museum in Markopoulo Mesogeias, Greece. Much of the collection is derived from excavations in the Sanctuary of Artemis at Brauron. Of note is a statue representing a small girl, a so-called "bear" (arktoi) (Medvedicka).
