= Linders =

Linders is a surname. Notable people with the surname include:

- Bengt Linders (1904–1984), Swedish swimmer
- Pelle Linders (born 1975), Swedish handball player
- Tullia Linders (1925–2008), Swedish archaeologist
