= Charalambos Bouras =

Greek restoration architect, engineer and architectural historian

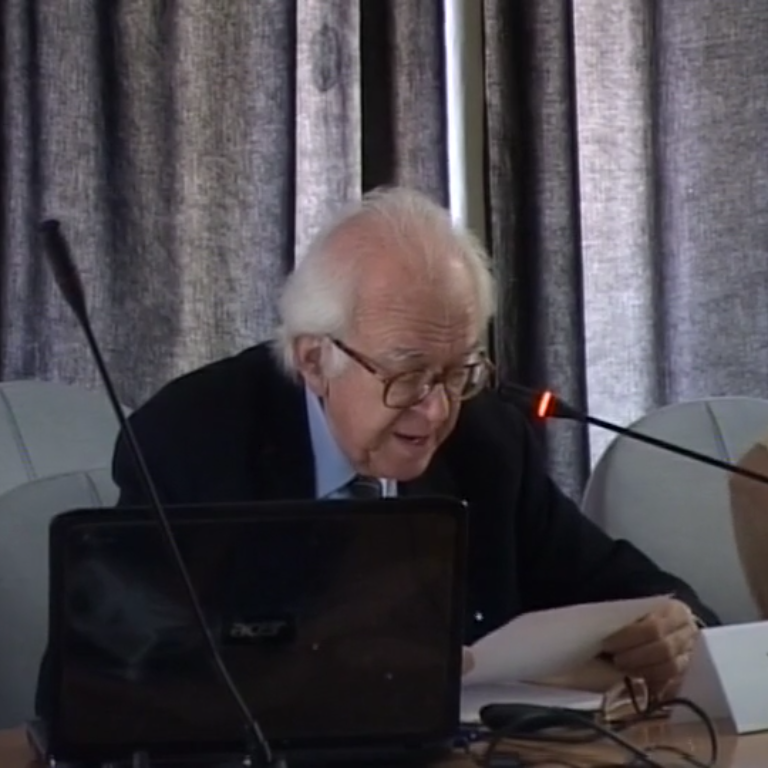
- Born: 17 July 1933; Preveza, Greece
- Died: 27 July 2016 (aged 83); Athens, Greece
- Education: National Technical University of Athens
- Occupation: Architect
- Practice: Restoration Architect, Historian and Professor
- Projects: Acropolis Restoration Service

Charalambos Bouras (Greek: Χαράλαμπος Μπούρας, 17 July 1933 – 27 July 2016) was a major Greek restoration architect, engineer and professor of architectural history. Amongst his most notable contributions are his restoration work on the Acropolis of Athens, in the ancient city of Brauron and on the monastery of Hosios Loukas, as well as his many books and scientific articles.

Bouras was an engineer for the Save the Parthenon program, a part of Greece's effort to preserve and restore the national monuments on the Acropolis.

== Academic career ==
Bouras received a diploma in Architectural Engineering from the National Technical University of Athens in 1952. In the following years he joined the Greek Archaeological Service as a member of the Directorate of Restoration of Ancient and Historic Monuments. In this role, he undertook the study and restoration of the fifth-century B.C.E. stoa at the Sanctuary of Artemis at Brauron (1961–1962). He then continued his studies at the Université de Paris (École Pratique des Hautes Études) under the supervision of André Grabar, receiving a doctorate in1964. He received a further doctorate from the Polytechnic School of Thessaloniki in 1966.

Bouras was a visiting fellow at Dumbarton Oaks 1977-8 and made a Fellow in 1983-4. He later became Professor Emeritus at the National Technical University of Athens and was made Chairman of The Committee for the Conservation of the Acropolis Monuments (ESMA) in 1985. He worked on the restoration of the Acropolis monuments for over 40 years and was one of the founding members of the Acropolis Restoration Service. He co-authored the first volume on Europa Nostra's restoration of the Parthenon and published a book on the Nea Moni of Chios. Photographs attributed to Charalambos and Laskarina Bouras are held by the Conway Library whose archive of primarily architectural images is being digitised under the wider Courtauld Connects project.

== Personal life ==
Charalambos Bouras was born in Preveza on 17 July 1933. He grew up in Chios, where his family moved when his father (a state chemist) was transferred there.

He was married to fellow architect and Byzantinist Laskarina Philippidou (Boura), who was curator of the Byzantine Collection of the Benaki Museum in Athens. She died in 1989 at an early age and he later married archaeologist Kornilia Hadjiaslani, with whom he had a son, Nikias.

Bouras died in Athens on July 27, 2016. He was buried on July 29, in the First Cemetery of Athens.

== Gallery ==
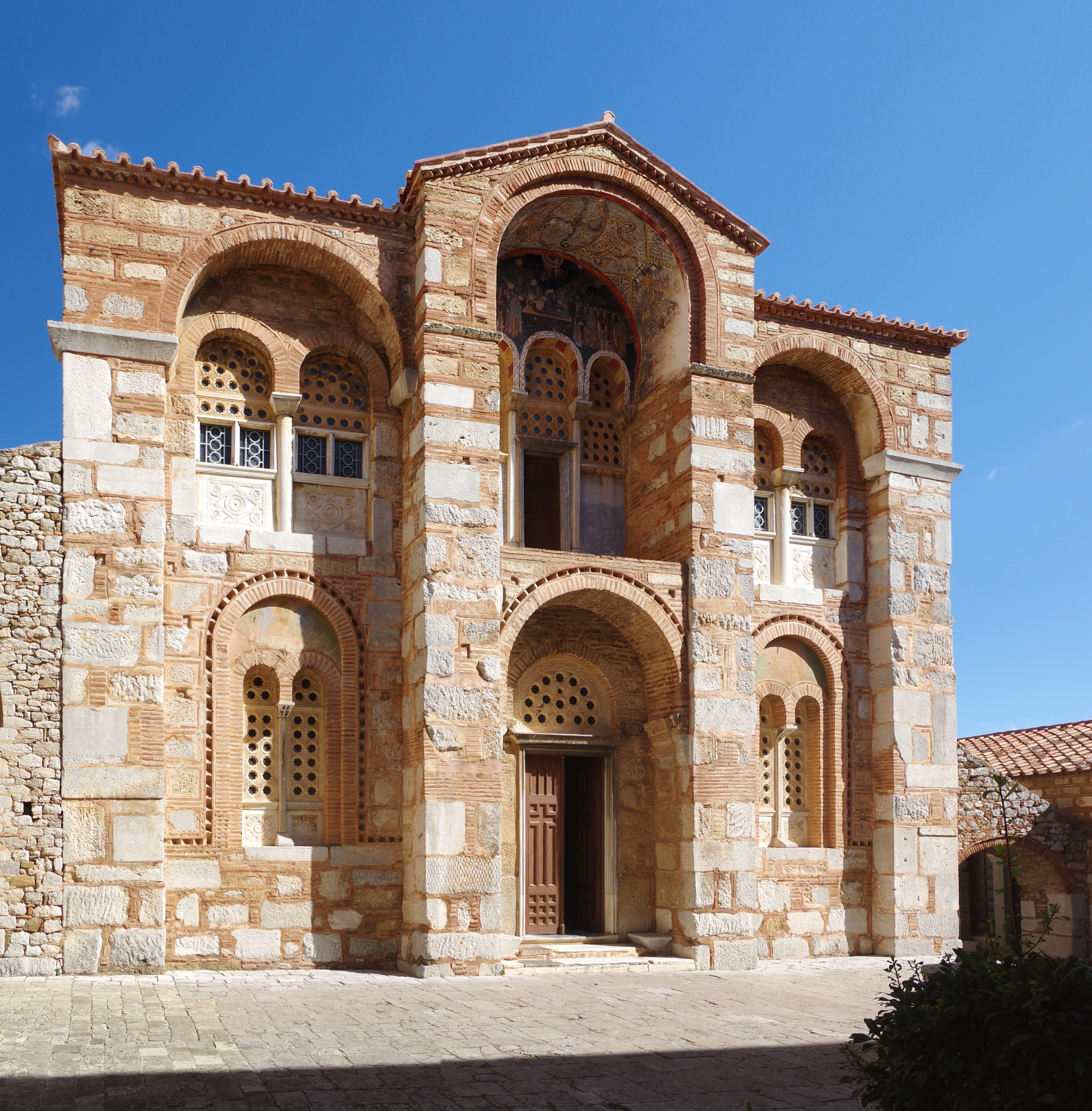
External view of the Theotokos church, Hosios Loukas

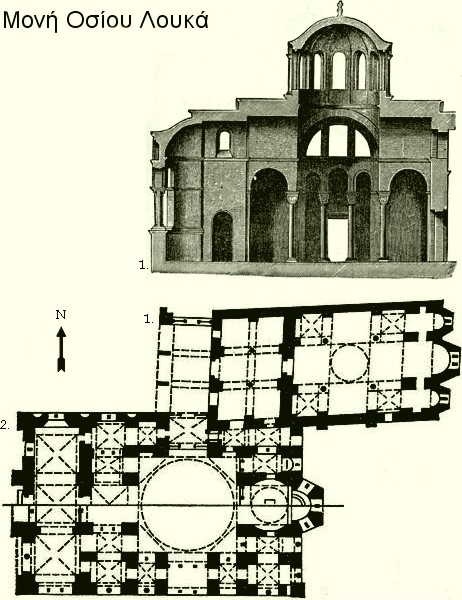
Section and plan of the katholikon of Hosios Loukas

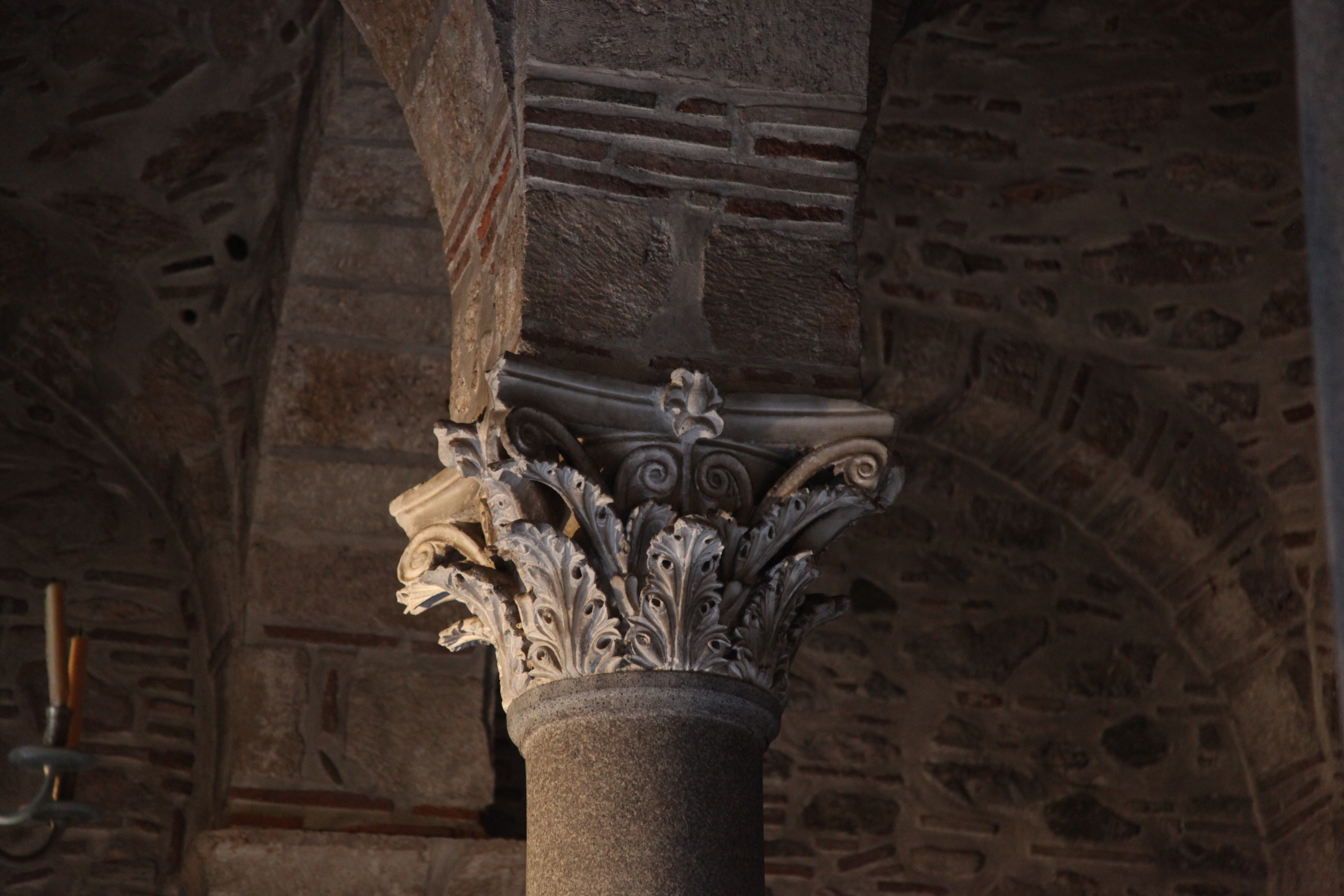
Capital of a column at Hosios Loukas

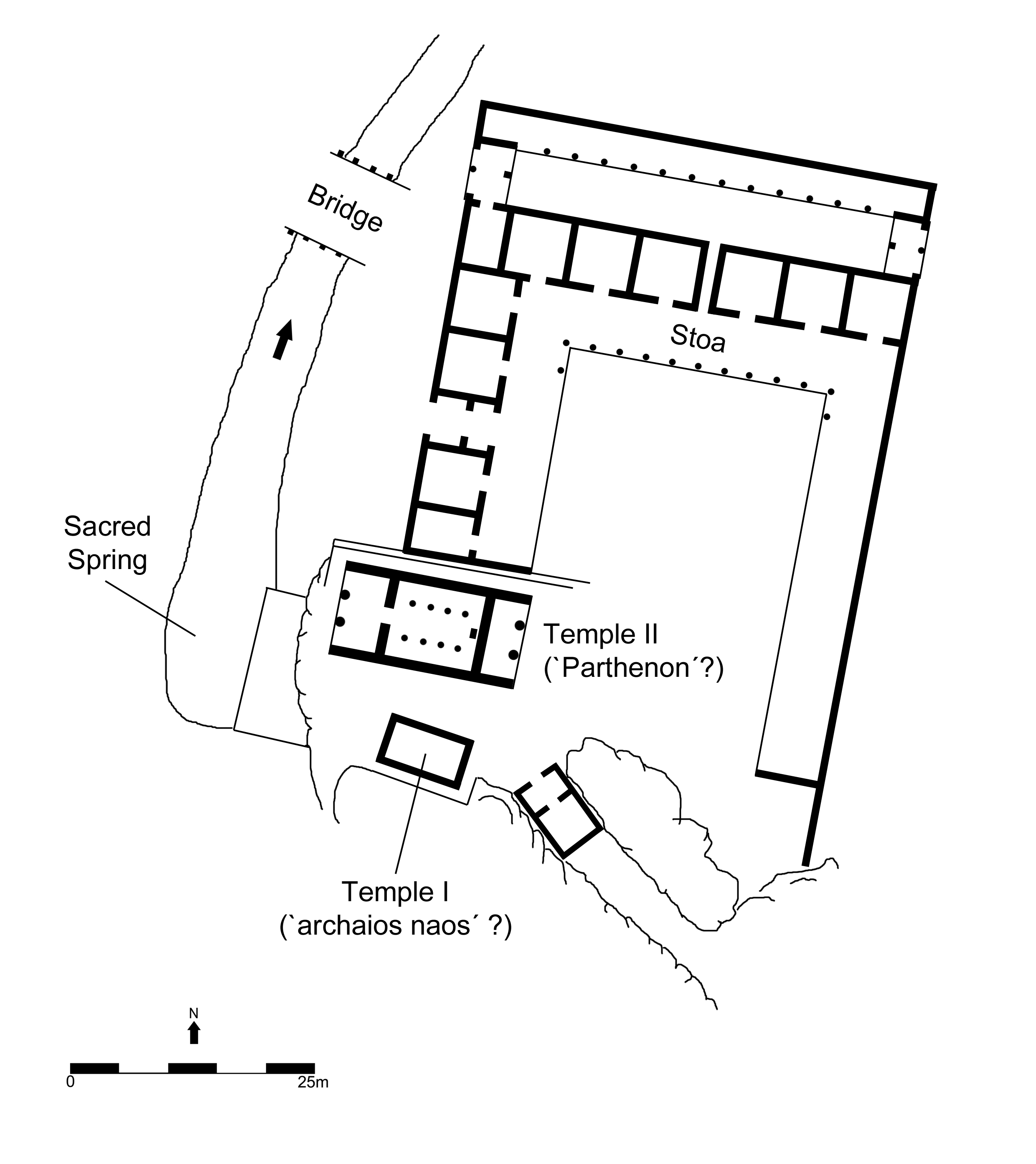
The Π-shaped stoa at Brauron

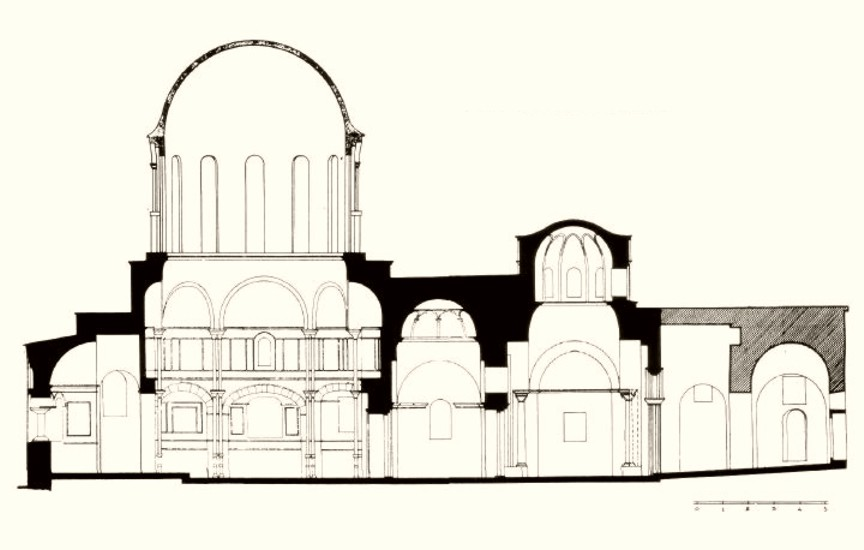
Section of the katholikon of the Nea Moni of Chios

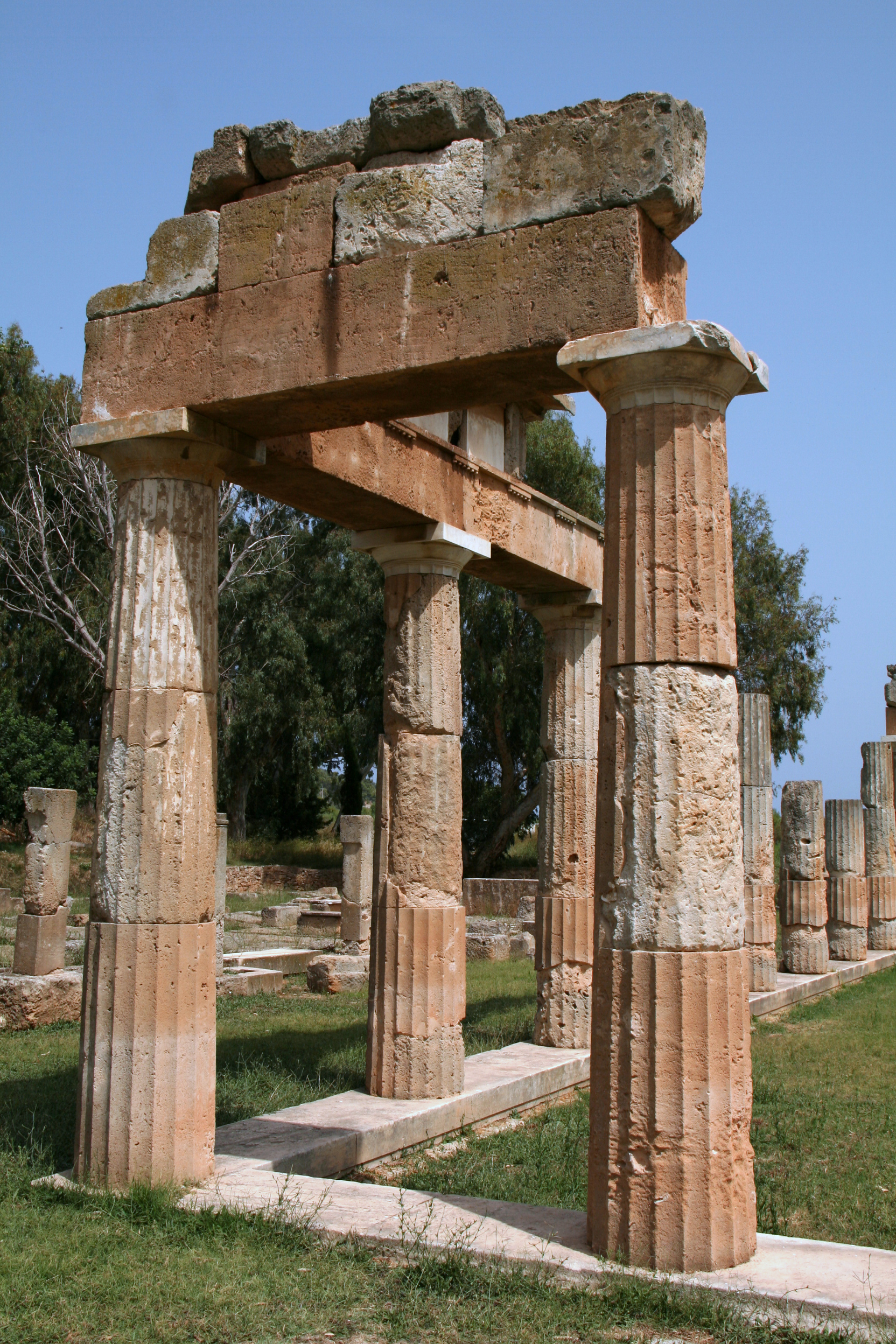
The stoa at Brauron

== Recognition and awards ==
- Commander of the Order of the Phoenix
- Silver medal of the Académie d'architecture, Paris (1995)
- Europa Nostra's "Dedicated Service" award for the European cultural heritage by the ESMA (2013)
- Europa Nostra's "Conservation" category award, for the Acropolis Propylaea maintenance projects.
- Award from the Academy of Athens for his book on the Nea Moni of Chios
- Award from the Academy of Athens for his book on Byzantine Athens
- Medal of Paul the Apostle of the Church of Greece

== Selected publications ==
- Byzantine Athens, 10th-12th Centuries, Abingdon-on-Thames : Routledge, 2018, ISBN 9781351596978
- Acropolis Restored, Charalambos Bouras, Maria Ioannidou and Ian Jenkins, London : British Museum Press, 2011, ISBN 9780861591879
- 'The Restitution Works on the Acropolis Museum’ in The Parthenon Marbles, The Case for Reunification, Christopher Hitchens, London : Verso Books, 2008, ISBN 9781844672523
- Hē Nea Monē tēs Chiou : historia kai architektonikē, Athēna : Emporikē Trapeza tēs Hellados, 1981
- Chios, Athens : National Bank of Greece, 1974
