= BH Air =

Bulgarian charter airline

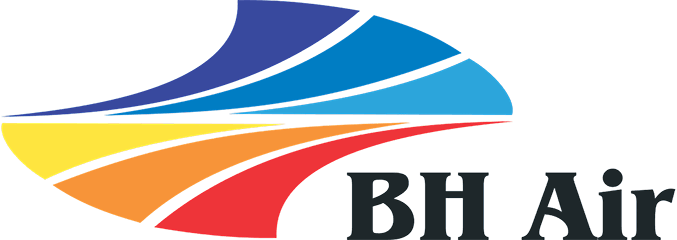

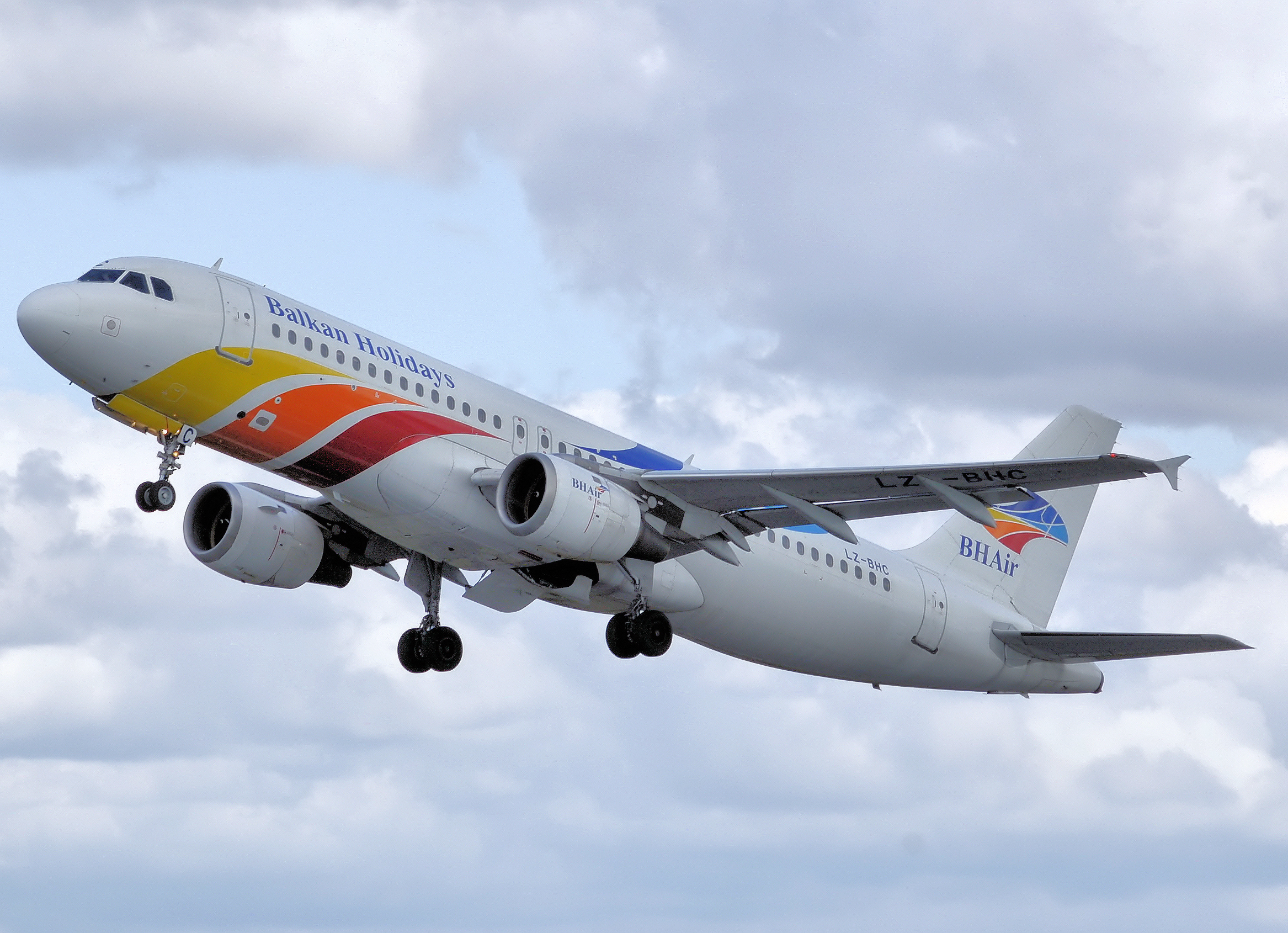
- Airbus A320-200
IATA	ICAO	Call sign
8H	BGH	BALKAN HOLIDAYS
- Founded: 2001
- Commenced operations: January 2002
- Hubs: Burgas Airport; Sofia Airport; Varna Airport
- Fleet size: 3
- Destinations: 20
- Headquarters: Sofia, Bulgaria
- Key people: Luchezar Lazarov, CEO
- Revenue: ▲€67.9 million (2017)
- Net income: ▼ -€9.5 million (2017)
- Website: www.bhairlines.com

BH Air Ltd. (Bulgarian: Би Ейч Еър) is a Bulgarian registered charter airline based in Sofia. Part owned by Balkan Holidays Services based in Sofia (not to be confused with Balkan Holidays Ltd, a London-based tour operator), BH Air provides charter flights to tour operators in the UK, Scandinavia, Germany, Italy, Switzerland and other European countries, as well as ad hoc charters to other destinations. Also, flights to Africa, Asia, and the Middle East are operated for groups traveling in connection with cultural and sports events and on business. The airline's main base is Vasil Levski Sofia Airport, with secondary ones at Burgas Airport, Varna Airport and Plovdiv International Airport.

== History ==
BH Air-Balkan Holiday Airlines was founded in late 2001 and began operations in February 2002 with charter flights to Sofia, Plovdiv, Burgas and Varna under contract from the UK tour operator "Balkan Holidays Ltd" (No Connection with BH Air). The airline began to fly with a single Tupolev Tu-154M, and the number of aircraft increased to four a few months later. In the summer of 2003 its first Airbus was put into operation. Later, the airline leased three more Airbus A320s, and the fleet increased to eight aircraft - four Tu-154Ms and four A320s. In 2004 the airline begin to perform charter flights for Balkan Holidays, Kuoni, TUI and a large number of smaller tour operators. For 2004 BH Air transported around 400,000 passengers to and from Bulgaria.

In 2005, BH Air signed a two-year contract for a wet lease with Virgin Group. This led to the creation of a new airline in Nigeria - Virgin Nigeria. BH Air aircraft also operated for Air Arabia and Pacific Airlines. In 2006, the airline retired its Tu-154s. In 2007, after the work with Virgin Group and gaining experience, BH Air participated in the creation of a new airline in Sri Lanka - Mihin Lanka. The company also operated private business flights with one Gulfstream G550 and one Gulfstream G200. The aircraft are operated mainly for First Investment Bank as private jets. On 17 January 2013 the company was granted an exemption from the United States of America Department of Transportation (DoT) for flights to USA specifically to New York City (JFK) and Chicago (ORD) as the company requested in its application to DoT in November 2012.

In July 2014, the airline took delivery of its first Airbus A330-223 (LZ-AWA). The aircraft are used for direct long-haul flights from Sofia to cities in the United States. BH Air also uses the aircraft on busy routes during the summer months to the United Kingdom and other European destinations. As of 2015, BH Air has over 250 employees, of which more than 40 are pilots and 100 are cabin crew. In March 2015 they formed a strategic alliance with SkyGreece Airlines. The aim of this strategic alliance is to strengthen their role in the Balkans. As part of this partnership, BH Air began operating flights between Athens and New York-JFK on behalf of SkyGreece Airlines on 30 June 2015. However, only a month after inaugurating the route, SkyGreece announced it would be suspending services to New York on 1 September 2015.

== Destinations ==
BH Air operated charter flights from the UK during Winter seasons to Vasil Levski Sofia Airport (contract finished in April 2015) but to date continues with the Summer seasons to Burgas Airport and Varna Airport. In August 2015 the company flew from Athens Airport to New York City on behalf of SkyGreece Airlines. It was planned but never started, that the company would start flying to Chicago as well. They also had plans also to start regular flights to Kuala Lumpur and Kolkata after they were chosen by the Bulgarian government to operate the two routes.

== Fleet ==
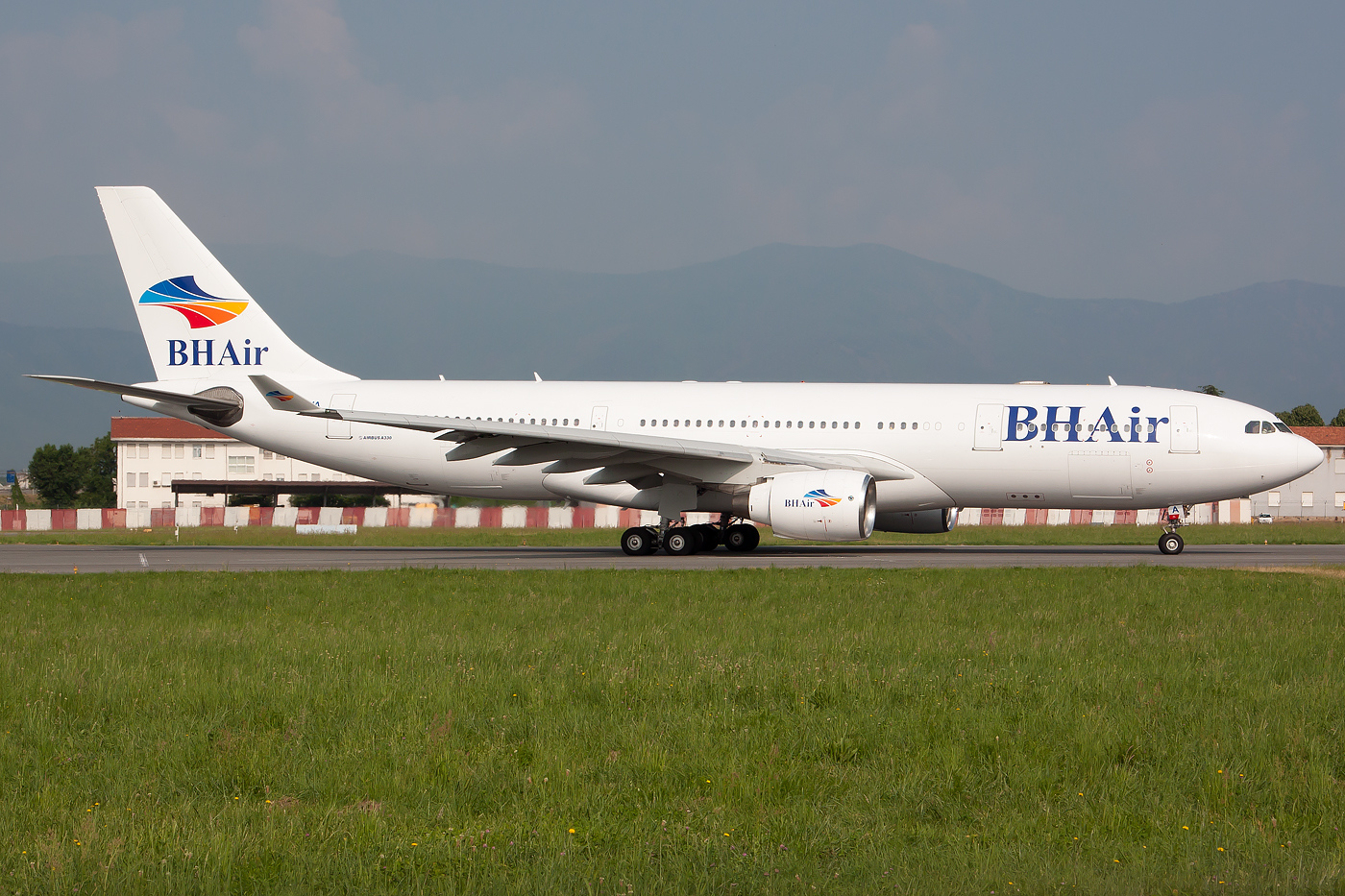
Airbus A330-200

=== Current fleet ===
As of August 2025, BH Air operates the following aircraft:

BH Air fleet
Aircraft	Total	Orders	Passengers			Notes
Aircraft	Total	Orders	C	Y	Total	Notes
Airbus A320-200	3	—	—	180	180	
Total	3	—				

=== Historical fleet ===
BH Air also used to operate the following aircraft which have meanwhile been phased out:

- Airbus A330-200
