= SkyGreece Airlines =

Canadian-owned airline situated in Attica, Greece

IATA	ICAO	Call sign
GW	SGR	SKYGREECE
- Founded: October 2012; Athens, Greece
- Ceased operations: 27 August 2015
- AOC #: GR-050
- Operating bases: Athens International Airport (Athens, Greece)
- Fleet size: 1
- Destinations: 7
- Headquarters: Markopoulo Mesogaias, Greece
- Key people: Fr. Nicholas Alexandris, Bill Alefantis, Peter Chilakos
- Website: SkyGreece.com (archive)

SkyGreece Airlines S.A. was a Canadian-owned Greek airline headquartered in Markopoulo Mesogaias, Attica, near Athens. On 27 August 2015, the airline suspended operations.

== History ==
SkyGreece Airlines was founded in Athens, Greece in October 2012, by a group of Greek-Canadian entrepreneurs and a retired priest. Fr. Nicholas Alexandris, Peter Chilakos, Bill Alefantis and Ken Stathakis.

The company's main mission was to connect the Greek diaspora to their homeland by offering non-stop flights between Greece and North America year-round. It had plans to offer flights to South Africa too. The airline aimed to offer "authentic Greek hospitality".

Its sole aircraft, a Boeing 767-300ER, was acquired in June 2013. It had been operated by Martinair. Prior starting service to North America, this airline started with charter flights to Somalia, Eritrea, Sweden and United Kingdom. It also did some flights during the Hajj season for Royal Air Maroc and also some flights for Air Madagascar. SkyGreece Airlines employed 160 staff with 100 land based in Greece and 60 as aircrew.

The inaugural flight was on 23 May 2015 to Montreal and Toronto with an aircraft lease from a Spanish airline named Privilege Style. Shortly after, the company experienced a depressurization problem on its airplane during a flight and had to return to Athens airport. SkyGreece also inaugurated service to New York and Thessaloniki with several days postponed blaming the capital controls and the lack on money for the fuel.

The airline had to cancel some of its flights especially on its New York route stating operational problems and capital controls. The route was operated by a Bulgarian airline named BH Air with an Airbus A330. The management of SkyGreece failed to pay BH Air.

In August 2015, a crack on the cockpit window caused the airplane to be grounded in Zagreb airport and the flight schedule to fall behind by several days. After that issue, all the flights were cancelled. Stranded passengers received no assistance from the airline. Its management blamed others for the issue and one of them resigned while he was on vacation in Greece.

On 3 September 2015, SkyGreece Airlines filed a notice of intention to make a proposal under the Bankruptcy and Insolvency Act in Canada. In November 2015, SkyGreece declared bankruptcy two months after ending operations.

== Fleet ==
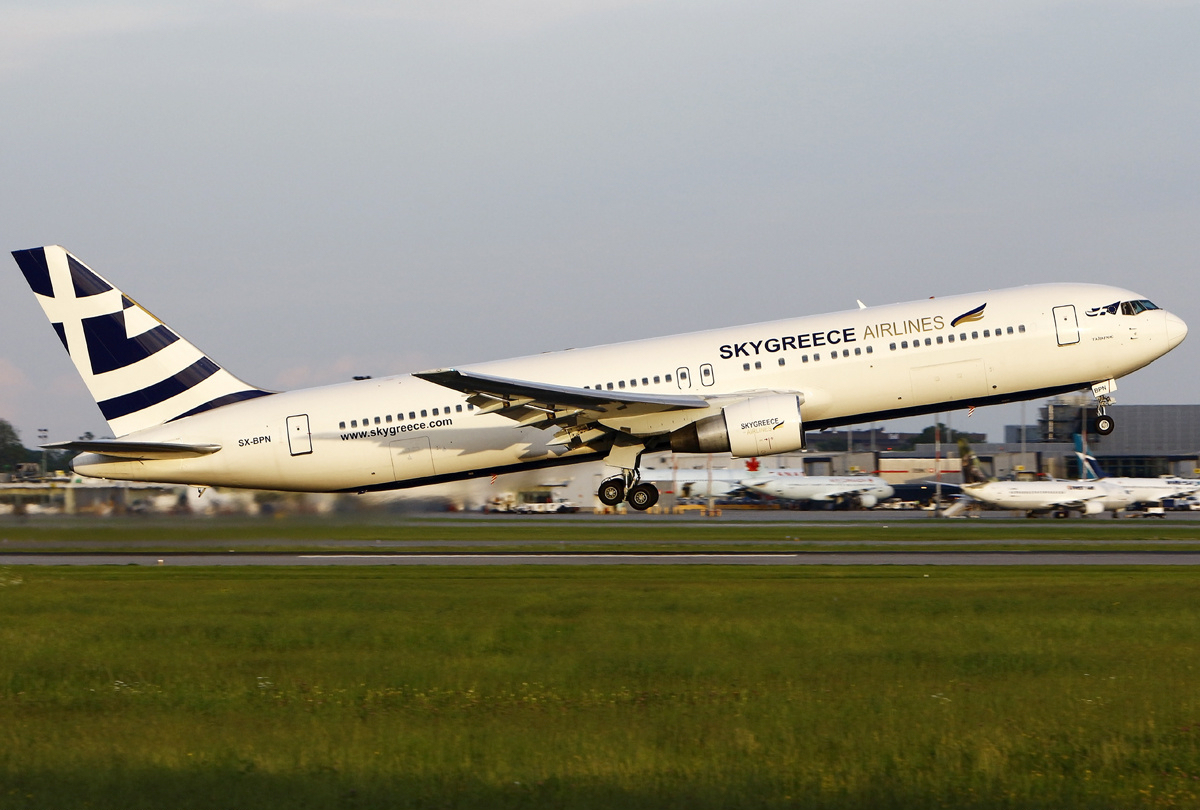
SkyGreece Airlines Boeing 767-300ER

SkyGreece Airlines operated the following fleet:

SkyGreece Airlines fleet
Aircraft	In service	Orders	Passengers			Notes
Aircraft	In service	Orders	W	Y	Total	Notes
Boeing 767-300ER	1	—	106	164	270	SX-BPN named "Taxiarhis"
Total	1	—				
