= Strongylion =

5th-century BC Greek sculptor

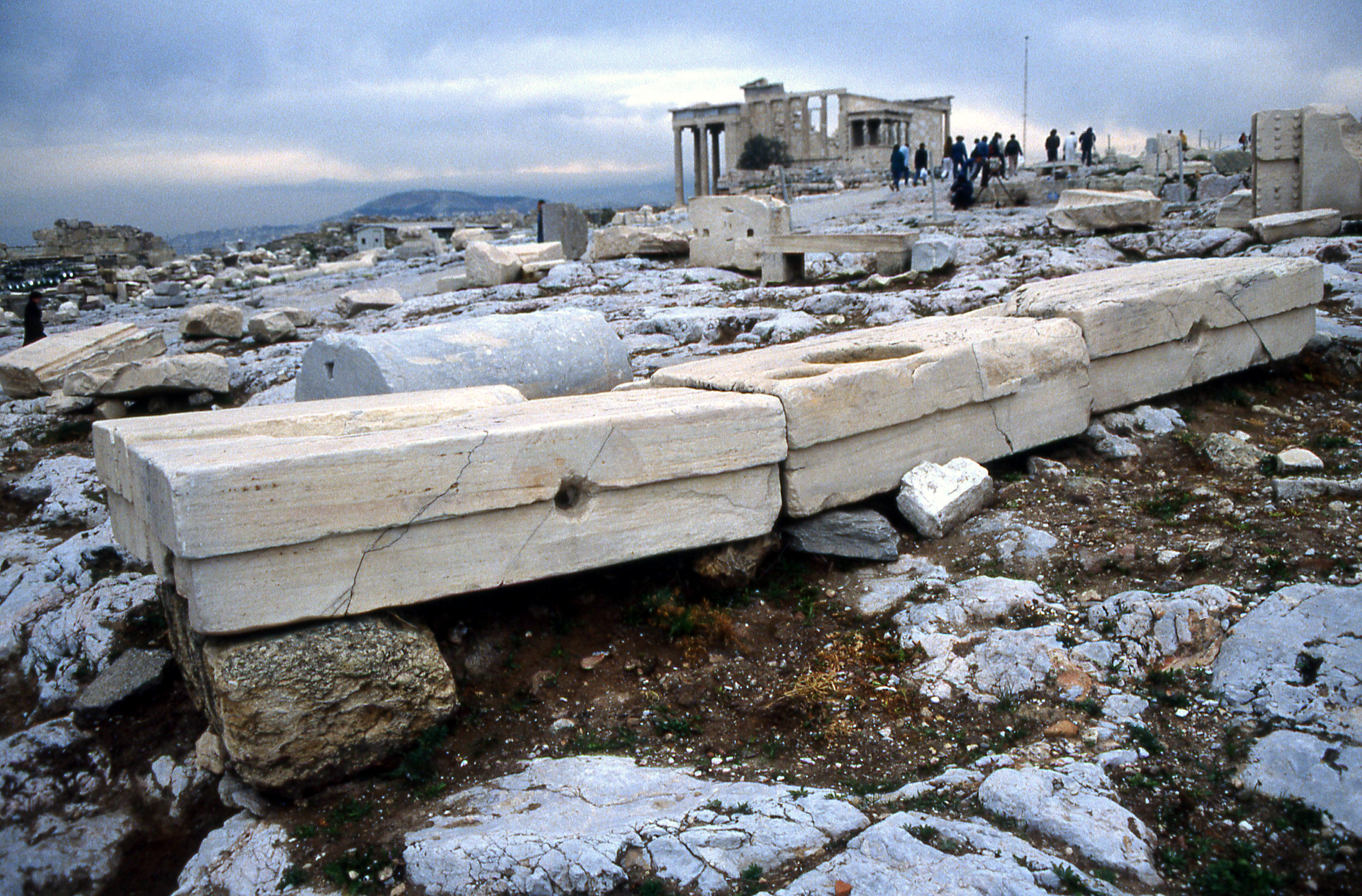
Base of Strongylion's Trojan Horse on the Athenian Acropolis

Strongylion was a Greek sculptor. He was the author of a bronze figure of a horse set up on the Acropolis of Athens late in the 5th century BC, which represented the Trojan horse with the Greek heroes inside it and looking forth. The inscribed base of this statue has been found.

Other works of the sculptor were a figure of Artemis at Megara, a group of the Muses, a statuette of a boy of which Brutus was very fond, and an Amazon which was greatly admired by the emperor Nero.
