= Anathyrosis =

Ancient masonry method

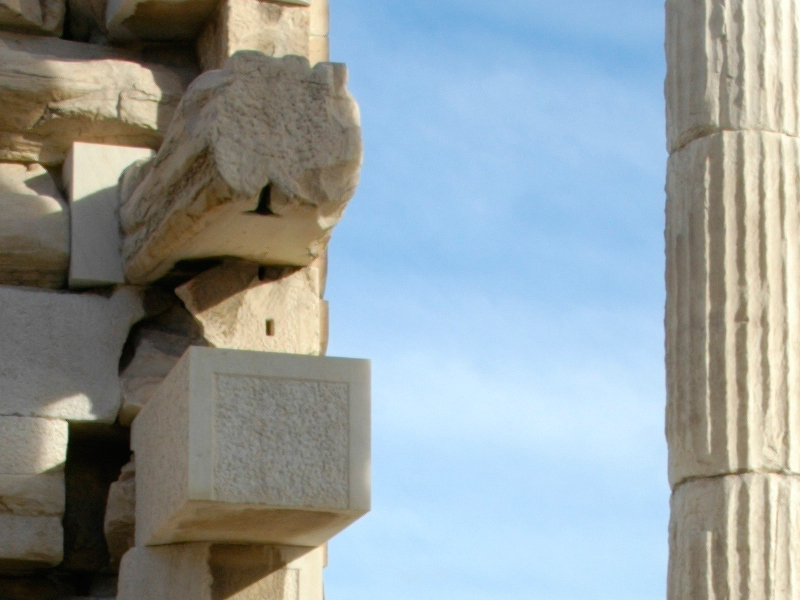
(L) Anathyrosis on a restored stone (below) and an ancient stone (above) in the Erechtheion in Athens, Greece

Anathyrosis is the technical word for the ancient method of dressing the joints of stone blocks in dry stone construction, i. e., masonry without mortar, which was then commonly used. Because the stone blocks are set in immediate contact with each other without gaps, their joints must be exactly dressed. In order to reduce the time required to sculpt such joints, the faces of the stones to be joined were finished and smoothed only in narrower margins on the sides and top of the faces to be joined, while the interior of adjoining faces were recessed. The smoothed margins of such a face together resemble a doorframe, and the word, created by the ancients, is allusive. Thyra (θύρα) is Greek for “door”, and thus “door framing” is anathyrosis.

This technique was frequently used to construct walls, including in ashlar form, and was used to join the drums of columns. Close examination of where this technique was applied to a specific stone block since removed or fallen away can help locate its placement in the edifice or determine whether it was joined to other blocks.
