= Markopoulo Mesogaias =

Markopoulo Mesogaias Μαρκόπουλο Μεσογαίας
- Municipality
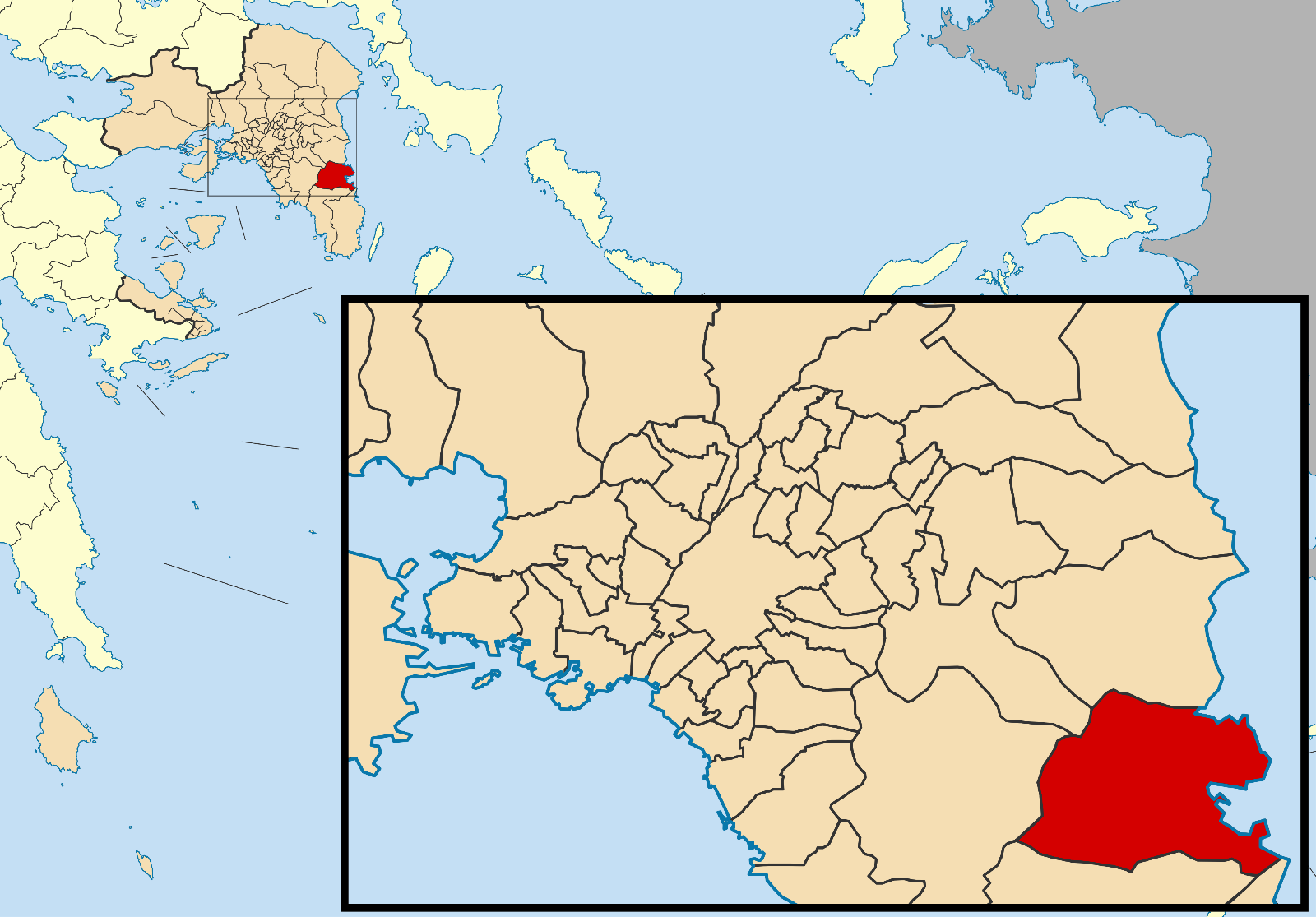

- Location within Greece
- Coordinates: 37°53′N 23°56′E
- Country: Greece
- Administrative region: Attica
- Regional unit: East Attica

Government
  - Mayor: Kostas Allagiannis (since 2019)

Area
  - Municipality: 81.84 km^{2} (31.60 sq mi)
- Elevation: 80 m (260 ft)

Population (2021)
  - Municipality: 21,722
  - Density: 265.4/km^{2} (687.4/sq mi)
- Time zone: UTC+2 (EET)
  - Summer (DST): UTC+3 (EEST)
- Postal code: 190 03
- Area code: 22990
- Vehicle registration: Z
- Patron saints: Saint Constantine and Saint Helena (21 May)
- Website: www.markopoulo.gr

Markopoulo Mesogaias (Greek: Μαρκόπουλο Μεσογαίας) is a town and a municipality in East Attica, Greece. The municipality has an area of 81.844 km^{2} (31.600 sq mi).

== Geography ==
The municipality Markopoulo Mesogaias is situated in the Mesogaia plain, in the eastern part of the Attica peninsula, and touches the Aegean Sea coast in the east, where the port town Porto Rafti is located. The town Markopoulo is in the western part of the municipality, at about 80 m (260 ft) elevation. It is 5 km (3.1 mi) north of Kalyvia Thorikou, 6 km (3.7 mi) east of Koropi and 21 km (13 mi) southeast of Athens city centre. Greek National Road 89 (Gerakas - Koropi - Lavrio - Sounio) passes through Markopoulo. Athens International Airport is 4 km (2.5 mi) north of the town. Markopoulo had a railway station on the Athens–Lavrion Railway, which closed for passenger traffic in 1957.

=== Settlements ===
- Agía Triáda (2021 census pop. 285)
- Vravróna, ancient Brauron (pop. 268) - located in the northeast by the Aegean Sea
- Chamoliá (pop. 134)
- Koulidás (pop. 115)
- Markópoulo (pop. 10,394) - the municipal seat
- Poriá (pop. 0)
- Porto Rafti or Limín Markopoúlou (pop. 10,526)

== History ==
Markopoulo along with Malakasa, Kakosalesi and Spata is one of the earliest villages formed by Arvanite settlers in medieval Attica and it had already appeared by 1456. As such, Markopoulo has historically been an Arvanite settlement.

=== Historical monuments ===
- The church of Saint Paraskevi, in 1741 (Markopoulo-Mesogeia). A wall painting monument (1741) of George Markou the Argus, the great and prolific post-Byzantine ecclesiastic iconographer of the 18th century ("....La Santa Parascevi (inizio della sua agiografia1741׃ ,(che si trova al paesimo di Marcopulo, dell 'Attica...." Evangelos Andreou)
- The church of Saint Thecla. A wall painting monument (18th century) of "Georgios Markou the Argeius" iconographers school
- The Temple of Artemis in Brauron

== Sports ==
Markopoulo was the home to two venues of the 2004 Summer Olympics: the Markopoulo Olympic Equestrian Centre and the Markopoulo Olympic Shooting Centre.

Markopoulo's women volleyball team plays in the A1 Ethniki Women's Volleyball, the highest level national competition. The city's Municipal Stadium is used for football and volleyball matches and has a capacity of 3,000 seats (stadium), an 600 seats (indoor hall) accompanied by a brand new gym hall built in 2019. Due to extended renovation works which have started on early 2024 and were completed in October 2025 for the 2025-26 Superleague 2 Greece, the football team of Marko has temporarily used the Koropi Municipal Stadium as a temporary stadium.

Sport clubs based in Markopoulo
Club	Founded	Sports	Achievements
Marko F.C.	1927	Football	Presence in Superleague 2
Markopoulo Athletic Club - AOM	1988	Volleyball	Presence in A1 Ethniki women volleyball

== Economy ==
Historically, the economy of the region has been largely agricultural, with grapes and wine being the major components of the local economy until today. The Merenda quarry also allowed for a major economic expansion during the 1990s, however operations have ceased since 2014. Today, tourism is a major driver as is a very popular tourist destination in Attica thanks to the port settlement of Porto Rafti .

Multiple companies, including SkyGreece Airlines have had their corporate headquarters in Markopoulo Mesogaias due to the easy access to Athens International Airport.

== Historical population ==
Year	Population
1981	9,388
1991	14,499
2001	15,608
2011	20,040
2021	21,722

== See also ==
- List of municipalities of Attica
