= Tullia Linders =

Swedish archaeologist (1925–2008)

Tullia Linders (1925–2008) was a Swedish archaeologist.

== Life ==
Tullia Linders studied Latin and Ancient Greek already at the equivalent of high school and later at university continued her studies in the classical languages and classical studies. She got a licentiate degree in 1954 and thereafter spent several years as a school teacher in Latin and Ancient Greek. At the same time she kept ties to the university, conducted research and spent time travelling and studying in the Mediterranean area. During this time she also published articles on archaeological and art historical issues, notably on ceramics and tombstones. In 1972 she got a doctoral degree and established herself firmly in the academic world in Sweden. Subsequently, she published a number of works on Greek temple treasures, as well as works about the Classical world directed towards a broader audience. In 1979 she was made professor of classical studies at Uppsala University. In 1989 she became a member of the Royal Swedish Academy of Letters, History and Antiquities.

== Works in English ==
- Linders, Tullia & Hellström, Pontus (red.), Architecture and society in Hecatomnid Caria: proceedings of the Uppsala symposium 1987, Univ., Uppsala, 1989
- Alroth, Brita & Linders, Tullia (red.), Economics of cult in the ancient Greek world: proceedings of the Uppsala Symposium 1990, Univ., Uppsala, 1992
- Linders, Tullia & Nordquist, Gullög C. (red.), Gifts to the gods: proceedings of the Uppsala symposium 1985, Univ., Uppsala, 1987
- Linders, Tullia, 'Recension av: Harris, Diane: The treasures of the Parthenon and Erechtheion.', Opuscula Atheniensia., 1997/98 (22/23), s. 162-166, 1999
- Linders, Tullia, 'Ritual display and the loss of power.', Religion and power in the ancient Greek world / edited by Pontus Hellström and Brita Alroth., S. [121]-124, 1996
- Linders, Tullia, Studies in the treasure records of Artemis Brauronia found in Athens, Svenska inst. i Athen, Diss. Stockholm : Univ., Aten, 1972
- Linders, Tullia, The treasurers of the other gods in Athens and their functions, Hain, Meisenheim am Glan, 1975
- Linders, Tullia (red.), Opuscula Atheniensia: annual of the Swedish Institute at Athens. 18, [Tullia Linders 1.7.1990], Svenska institutet i Athen, Stockholm, 1990
