= Ioannis Miliadis =

Greek archaeologist (1895–1975)

- Ιωάννης Μηλιάδης
- Born: 1895; Athens
- Died: September 24, 1975 (aged 79–80); Acropolis of Athens

Academic background
- Education: University of Athens
- Influences: Christos Tsountas

Academic work
- Discipline: Archaeology
- Institutions: Greek Archaeological Service; Acropolis Museum, Athens

Ioannis Miliadis (Greek: Ιωάννης Μηλιάδης) (1895 – 24 September 1975) was a Greek archaeologist. Known as an advocate of innovation and modernisation in Greek archaeology, he joined the Greek Archaeological Service in 1919, excavated widely, and was made director of the Acropolis Museum in 1940. During the Second World War, he joined the communist-led resistance to the Axis occupation of Greece and concealed artefacts and antiquities from the German occupiers. His left-wing beliefs led him to be deported to El Dabaa in Egypt in 1944, and forced to resign from the Archaeological Service in 1947.

Miladis was reinstated in 1951, and served at the Acropolis Museum until 1961. In retirement, he was made a board member of the National Theatre of Greece. He was a lifelong writer, poet and translator, often writing these works under pseudonyms. He died on 24 September 1975, at a meeting at the Ministry of Culture on the Acropolis.

== Life ==
Ioannis Miliadis was born in Athens in 1895. His father, Nikolaos Miliadis, was an officer in the Hellenic Army; his mother was Kalliopi Koufogianni. The younger Miliadis studied at the Philosophical School of the University of Athens, where he was a student of the archaeologist Christos Tsountas, and took classes in law, and carried out postgraduate study in Vienna, Berlin and Munich. He became a supporter of demoticisation, and joined a youth movement affiliated to Alexandros Papanastasiou, a Venizelist, republican politician. From his youth, Miliadis wrote poems, essays and translations, often under pseudonyms: one of these was "Julius Narcissus". His romantic attraction to a high school friend who would later become a famous writer and philosopher, Helle Lambridis, was developed into an infatuation for her, as the editor of their correspondence from the 1920s and 1930s argues, seeing Miliadis' 'one-sided' feelings, in the 'intensely passionate' letters he wrote to her, as revealing of a 'non-consumate' romantic relationship.

Miliadis entered the Greek Archaeological Service in 1919, and became an ephor (archaeological inspector) in 1925. His excavations included work at Agrinio, Thermos, Ambrakia, Nikopolis, Corfu and Lefkada. Miliadis, along with Christos Karouzos and Semni Papaspyridi, became known as a leading advocate of modernisation and innovation in Greek archaeology: the three promoted the use of Demotic Greek and the incorporation of liberal and Marxist ideas into the field. In March 1931, he was ephor of the island of Corfu: John Papadimitriou was posted there as his assistant.

In 1940, Miliadis was made director of the Acropolis Museum, and concealed its holdings from the German occupiers during the Axis occupation of Greece. The archaeological historians Dimitra Kokkinidou and Marianna Nikolaidou describe him as "a dynamic opponent of German interference". On 28 October 1941, the archaeologist Spyridon Marinatos made a public address commemorating the dictator Ioannis Metaxas's defiance of the Italian dictator Benito Mussolini the previous year. In it, he praised both Metaxas, who had died that January, and the exiled George II, who had made Metaxas prime minister after his own restoration in a military coup led by Georgios Kondylis. (Note: Kokkinidou & Nikolaidou 2006, p. 167; Petrakos 2015, p. 35. For the relationship between George, Metaxas and Kondylis, see Koliopoulos & Veremis 2010, p. 103.) Miliadis, alongside Karouzos, wrote to the collaborationist prime minister, Konstantinos Logothetopoulos, criticising Marinatos's conduct. (Note: Petrakos 2015, pp. 35–36. For Kordatos's politics, see Mishkova 2022, p. 130.) In the autumn of 1944, Karouzos was offered the position of director of the Archaeological Service: he declined it, and recommended Miliadis for the task.

During the Axis occupation, Miliadis joined the communist-led National Liberation Front (EAM), and was a founding member in 1941 of the Union of People's Democracy, a socialist political party under the umbrella of the EAM. He attended the first meeting of the EAM's National Council at Koryschades in 1944, (Note: Karokotia 2013. On El Dabaa, see Karrer 2015.) temporarily leaving his post in the Archaeological Service in order to do so. After the clashes of December 1944 between communist and royalist forces (the Dekemvriana), he was deported for his left-wing beliefs to El Dabaa in Egypt, an internment camp used for approximately 8,000–10,000 former members of the Greek resistance, (Note: Karokotia 2013. On El Dabaa, see Karrer 2015.) and forced to resign from the Archaeological Service in 1947. In 1948, he wrote to the German archaeologist Frank Brommer, who had been a member of the German Archaeological Institute at Athens during the Nazi occupation, refusing to assist him with his work on the Patras shield, on the grounds of the "barbaric occupation of our country by the National Socialists".

Miliadis was reinstated to the Archaeological Service in 1951, and returned to the directorship of the Acropolis Museum. He retired in 1961. In 1964, he was appointed to the board of directors of the National Theatre of Greece, following the resignation of Giorgos Seferis. In the same year, the archaeologist Manolis Andronikos wrote to him, saying "I saw and see in you an honest and brave representative of a militant generation that gave us some high examples of morality". Miliadis died on 24 September 1975, at a meeting at the Ministry of Culture on the Acropolis of Athens.

== Works cited ==
- Kankeleit, Alexandra (2023). "'Unrestricted Research Opportunities' with 'Unpleasant Surprises': German Archaeologists in Greece During the National Socialist Era". In Modl, Daniel; Nuijen, Erwin; Meheux, Katie; Eickhoff, Martijn (eds.). National-Socialist Archaeology in Europe and Its Legacies. Cham: Springer. pp. 257–280. ISBN 978-3-031-28024-5.
- Karrer, Aris (2015-11-23). Ελ Ντάμπα, στρατόπεδο συγκέντρωσης κομμουνιστών και αγωνιστών της Εθνικής Αντίστασης [El Dabaa: Concentration Camp of Communists and National Resistance Fighters]. Atechnos.com (in Greek).
- Karokotia, Kostas (2013-07-21). Η ανάδυση ενός διανοούμενου και μιας εποχής [The Emergence of an Intellectual and an Era]. Kathemerini (in Greek).
- Kokkinidou, Dimitra; Nikolaidou, Marianna (2006) [2004]. "On the Stage and Behind the Scenes: Greek Archaeology in Times of Dictatorship". In Galaty, Michael L.; Watkinson, Charles (eds.). Archaeology Under Dictatorship. New York: Springer. pp. 155–190. ISBN 0306485095.
- Koliopoulos, John S; Veremis, Thanos M. (2010). Modern Greece: A History Since 1821. Chichester: Wiley-Blackwell. ISBN 978-1-4443-1483-0.
- Mishkova, Diana (2022). Rival Byzantiums: Empire and Identity in Southeastern Europe. Cambridge: Cambridge University Press. doi:10.1017/9781108759557. ISBN 978-1-108-49990-3.
- Petrakos, Vasileios (1997). Ιωάννης Κ. Παπαδημητρίου [John K. Papadimitriou]. Έπαινος Ιωάννου Κ. Παπαδημητρίου [Praise of John K. Papadimitriou] (PDF). Library of the Archaeological Society of Athens (in Greek). Vol. 168. Archaeological Society of Athens. pp. 9–51. ISBN 960-7036-70-0.
- Petrakos, Vasileios (2015). Ὁ πολιτικὸς Μαρινᾶτος [The Political Marinatos] (PDF). Mentor. 114: 16–49.
- Stergiopoulos, Vangelis (2022-09-24). Γιάννης Μηλιάδης: Υψηλό υπόδειγμα ήθους [Yiannis Miliadis: High Model of Ethos]. in.gr.
- Stergiopoulos, Vangelis (2024-09-24). Γιάννης Μηλιάδης: Δίκαιος κ’ ίσιος σ’ όλες του τις πράξεις [Yiannis Miliadis: Just and Fair in All of His Actions]. in.gr.
