= Venetia Kotta =

Greek archaeologist (d. 1945)

Venetia Kotta (Pontic: Βενετία Κώττα; 1897 or 1901 – 1945) was a Pontic Greek archaeologist, museum curator, and Byzantine historian from Sampsunta in the former Ottoman Empire.

== Early life and education ==
Venetia Kotta was born in 1897 or 1901 in Sampsunta, then part of the Ottoman Empire. Her parents belonged to the Pontus region's Greek-speaking minority.

Kotta completed her high school education in Russia. Later, she ran a girls' school for Romanian Greeks in Bucharest. During the 1920s, she went to universities in Athens and Paris. She studied the Byzantines under Gabriel Millet and earned a PhD while attending school in Paris.

== Career ==
In 1933, Kotta applied for a job at the University of Thessaloniki, aiming to teach a course about the people's public and private lives in Byzantine times. Her application was rejected, possibly on the basis of her gender.

In the 1930s, Kotta became involved with Greece's archaeological community. She wrote for the Archaiologiki Ephimeris, one of Greece's prominent archaeological journals. In the journal's 1937 edition, Kotta published a piece about a rare icon of Mary. That same year, she was a member of the Archaeological Society of Athens.

During the early 1900s, though the sciences in Greece were male-dominated, some women entered careers as archaeologists. In the decades between WWI and WWII, two women were appointed to the state-run Greek Archaeological Service: Semni Karouzou and Eirene Varoucha-Christodoulopoulou, who worked as excavators. Contemporary activist Avra Theodoropoulou called their promotion a "feminist victory".

After the authoritarian Prime Minister Ioannis Metaxas came to power in 1936, a law was passed which forbade women from joining the Archaeological Service. Women already employed there could continue to work, but they couldn't become the directors of museums or archaeological programs. No women joined the Service until the law was abolished in 1955, with two exceptions.

Venetia Kotta was one such exception. She joined the Archaeological Service under the special circumstance of WWII. She worked in the Byzantine Museum for over a decade. She became a curator of the Byzantine Museum in 1943, specializing in Byzantine textiles and other handmade artifacts.

Kotta worked at the Byzantine Museum until her death in 1945.

== Writing ==
Venetia Kotta wrote about Byzantine art and philology.

- Kotta, Venetia L. (1931). The Byzantine Theatre (in French). Lib. orientaliste Paul Geuthner.
- Kotta, Venetia (1934–1936). "On the illustration of the Epitaph in relation to the Passion Sequence of Holy Week". Bulletin of the Christian Archaeological Society (in Greek). 3.
- Kotta, Venetia (1936–1938). "The evolution of the iconographic representation of Elkomenos (Christ) in Christian art". Bulletin of the Christian Archaeological Society (in Greek). 4: 5–27.
- Kotta, Venetia (1937). "Περί σπανίας παραστάσεως της Θεοτόκου επί εικόνος του Βυζαντινού Μουσείου Αθηνών" [About a rare representation of the Virgin Mary in the Byzantine Museum of Athens]. Archaiologiki Ephimeris: 673–686.
