= Greek Archaeological Service =

Branch of Greek government for antiquities

Department overview
- Formed: 1833
- Jurisdiction: Government of Greece
- Department executive: Olympia Vikatou, Director of Antiquities and Cultural Heritage
- Parent department: Ministry of Culture and Sports

The Greek Archaeological Service (Greek: Αρχαιολογική Υπηρεσία, romanised: Archaiologikí Ypiresía) is a state service, under the auspices of the Greek Ministry of Culture, responsible for the oversight of all archaeological excavations, museums and the country's archaeological heritage in general.

The Greek Archaeological Service is the oldest such institution in Europe: it was founded in 1833, on the back of state efforts to regulate antiquities that had been ongoing since at least 1825, and given its legal basis in 1834. Its officers were known as "ephors" for most of its history, and have included some of Greece's foremost archaeologists, including Christos Tsountas, Valerios Stais, and Semni Karouzou. Its directors, originally under the title of "Ephor General", have included Kyriakos Pittakis, Panagiotis Kavvadias and Spyridon Marinatos, and have been influential both in the excavation and conservation of Greek antiquities and in the shaping of archaeological law.

Initially a small department, usually comprising only the Ephor General, the Archaeological Service gradually expanded over the second half of the nineteenth century. Panagiotis Efstratiadis began the process of recruiting additional archaeologists and expanding the service's operations outside Athens, while Panagiotis Kavvadias expanded its numbers further and instituted a competitive system of examination for prospective ephors. The service's prestige declined following the ousting of Kavvadias in 1909, though its operations expanded to include a museum of Byzantine archaeology and via the archaeological law of 1932, which gave it authority to issue excavation permits to Greece's foreign archaeological institutes. Under the dictatorial prime minister Ioannis Metaxas and the service's director Spyridon Marinatos, legislation passed in 1939 banned women from joining the Archaeological Service or serving as the directors of museums and regional ephorates. This ban was overturned in 1959 by John Papadimitriou, who secured additional funding and political independence for the service.

The Archaeological Service was again reorganised in 1982, following Marinatos's return to the directorship under the Regime of the Colonels: this reform ended the use of the title of "ephor" for archaeological officials. In 2014, it was again reformed to amalgamate the ephorates of prehistoric and classical archaeology with those of Byzantine and later archaeology, creating a single regional unit for each area of Greece.

== Early history ==
The Greek Archaeological Service is the oldest such service in Europe, being founded in 1833 and formally legally instituted in 1834. Following lobbying from the humanist scholar Adamantios Korais, the Greek interior minister, Grigorios Dimitrios (generally known as Papaflessas) issued a decree in 1825, which was the first governmental attempt in Greece to regulate collections of antiquities and ensure the protection of ancient remains. A further decree, issued in 1827, prohibited the export or sale of Greek antiquities outside Greece. Ioannis Kapodistrias, the first head of state of independent Greece, appointed the Corfiote antiquarian Andreas Moustoxydis as "Director and Ephor" of the first national archaeological museum, then on the island of Aegina, in October 1829. Mustoxydis resigned in March 1832, following the assassination of Kapodistrias.

The Archaeological Service was formally instituted by a decree of 17 July [O.S. 5 July] (Note: Until 1923, Greece used the Julian calendar, known as the Old Style.) 1833 by the Minister for Education, Spyridon Trikoupis, founded the Greek Archaeological Service. Trikoupis appointed the Bavarian architect Adolf Weissenberg as "Ephor of Antiquities" (Greek: Ἔφορος τῶν ἀρχαιοτήτων, romanised: eforos ton archaiotiton) with responsibility for "the conservation, discovery and collection of the archaeological treasures of the kingdom". Three others were appointed with the title of 'sub-ephor' (Greek: ὑποέφορος, romanised: hupoeforos): Kyriakos Pittakis, for central and northern Greece; Ludwig Ross, for the Peloponnese, and Ioannis Kokkonis for the Aegean Islands. The service was given formal legal constitution by a law of 13 February [O.S. 1 February] 1834. Officers of the Archaeological Service were known as ephors (lit. 'overseers').

Weissenberg's short tenure saw the passage of the Archaeological Law of 10/22 May 1834, which named all antiquities in Greece as the "national property of all the Greeks", asserted the ownership of the state over all archaeological sites not already on private land and created the core administrative structure of the Archaeological Service. He was accused by Ross of lacking interest in antiquities, and also attracted the enmity of Josef Ludwig von Armansperg, head of the regency council of the underage King Otto, by trying to organise opposition to his government alongside the regent Georg Ludwig von Maurer,. Both Weissenberg and von Maurer were sacked (along with Kokkonis) in September 1834 and recalled to Bavaria. In Weissenberg's stead, Ross was named as Ephor General of Antiquities, with Pittakis and Athanasios Iatridis as his assistants. Ross was himself forced to resign in 1836, following a public feud with Pittakis over a series of inscriptions known as the "Naval Records", of which Ross had sent sketches to the German scholar August Böckh for the Corpus Inscriptionum Graecarum, his compilation of ancient Greek inscriptions, despite having not yet received approval to publish them. The affair became a focal point for Greek resentment against the mostly Bavarian northern-European scholars who, on the invitation of King Otto, dominated Greek archaeology.

On Ross's resignation, Pittakis was appointed ephor of the Central Public Museum for Antiquities, making him the most senior archaeologist employed by the Greek Archaeological Service and its de facto head. He received the title of Ephor General in 1843. (Note: According to Kokkou, Pittakis was not formally named to the position until 12 January 1849 [O.S. 31 December 1848].) Pittakis served until his death in 1863, making widespread excavations, restorations and demolitions on the Acropolis of Athens, including the destruction of the Parthenon mosque, large-scale restorations to the Propylaia, and authorising the use of explosives by the French scholar Charles Ernest Beulé to uncover what became known as the Beulé Gate.

== Expansion and reform (1871–1909) ==
Pittakis was succeeded by Panagiotis Efstratiadis, a prominent member of the Archaeological Society of Athens. Efstratiadis expanded the work of the Archaeological Service outside Athens, supporting excavations on the island of Euboea. He also secured ministerial approval for the 1875 demolition of the medieval Frankish Tower on the Acropolis, carried out by the Archaeological Society with funding from the German businessman and archaeologist Heinrich Schliemann, and sent his personal assistant, Panagiotis Stamatakis, to supervise Schliemann's 1876 excavations of Mycenae. Efstratiadis attempted, largely unsuccessfully, to use the state's powers against the illegal excavation and export of antiquities: in 1867, he denounced the epigrapher and art dealer Athanasios Rhousopoulos for selling the so-called Aineta aryballos to the British Museum, calling him "university professor, antiquities looter", while in 1873 he failed to prevent the art dealer Anastasios Erneris from selling a series of funerary plaques, painted by Exekias, to the German archaeologist Gustav Hirschfeld. The archaeologist and archaeological historian Yannis Galanakis has judged that the limited financial and legal resources available to Efstratiadis, as well as the lack of political will to assist him on the part of the Greek state, meant that his goal of controlling the illegal excavation and trade of antiquities was "impossible to achieve".

Until the mid-1870s, the Greek Archaeological Service consisted entirely of the Ephor General himself, sometimes supported by a personal assistant. In 1871, the privately organised Archaeological Society of Athens, which had taken on some of the state's responsibility for excavating and managing cultural heritage, began to appoint its own travelling ephors, known as 'apostles'. The primary duties of these 'apostles' were to conduct archaeological work throughout Greece, to combat archaeological looting and the illegal trade in antiquities, and to persuade citizens to hand over antiquities, particularly those acquired illegally, to the care of the state. The first of these was Stamatakis, whose work formed the basis for several public archaeological collections throughout Greece. From the 1870s, the Archaeological Service began to employ its own ephors, expanding continuously until the early 1910s. These ephors generally had responsibility for a particular region of Greece: Stamatakis, for example, was recruited in 1875 to oversee antiquities in Central Greece. Efstratiadis also recruited Panagiotis Kavvadias, followed by Konstantinos Dimitriadis in 1881 and by five further appointments in 1883 and 1885, including those of Christos Tsountas and Valerios Stais. This expansion continued throughout the next two decades, providing the core of the service's twentieth-century administrative apparatus.

On Efstratiadis's retirement in 1884, Stamatakis succeeded him: he established several local archaeological museums around Greece, but died of malaria less than a year after his appointment, and was succeeded by Kavvadias in 1885. Kavvadias finished the excavation of the Acropolis and the removal of almost all of its post-classical structures. He also published the service's first periodical, the monthly Archaeological Bulletin (Ἀρχαιολογικὸν Δελτίον), expanded its portfolio of museums, and worked to increase the influence of the Archaeological Service at the expense of that of the Archaeological Society, of which he was also a prominent member. He created much of the bureaucratic apparatus of the modern Archaeological Service. Through a royal decree of 7 December [O.S. 25 November] 1885, he established the Archaeological Receipts Fund, which used the proceeds of the sales of tickets, casts and catalogues by museums to fund the conservation and restoration of ancient monuments. He was also behind the Royal Decree of 20 January [O.S. 8 January] 1886, which created the first systematic division of Greece into archaeological regions.

Kavvadias continued the recruitment of new ephors: by the end of his tenure, the Service had recruited over a dozen (having previously employed only the Ephor General between 1836 and 1866), (Note: In 1866, Panagiotis Stamatakis was hired as an assistant to Panagiotis Efstratiadis, a position he held until Efstratiadis's retirement in 1884.) including Habbo Gerhard Lolling and Konstantinos Kourouniotis, and established operations on the island of Crete, then an autonomous province of the Ottoman Empire. He also imposed the first formal academic criteria for ephors – his predecessor as Ephor General, Panagiotis Stamatakis, had received no university education or formal archaeological training – requiring that all ephors be graduates of the University of Athens, and either to have undertaken postgraduate study in archaeology or to pass an examination in archaeology, history, Ancient Greek and Latin. In 1887, he imposed the stricter requirement that all potential ephors hold a doctorate in either philology or archaeology, and that they subsequently pass an interview before a board composed of professors of classics, archaeology and history. Following the Goudi coup of 10 September [O.S. 28 August] 1909, Kavvadias's subordinates launched their own so-called "mutiny of the ephors", angered by his style of leadership, which has since been described as both "authoritarian" and "tyrannical". He was forced to step down, following heavy criticism in the press, in December 1909. The Greek government subsequently reorganised the Archaeological Service. Kavvadias's duties were given to the archaeologist Gabriel Byzantinos, who was shortly afterwards replaced by Vasileios Leonardos, the director of Athens's Epigraphical Museum. Under Law 3721, dated 13 April [O.S. 31 March] 1910, the General Ephorate was abolished, in favour of a more collective system of management where the function of the Ephor General was assumed by the 'Archaeological Board', a ten-member committee of university professors, ephors and the directors of Athens's museums, on which the newly titled Director of the Archaeological Service had a single vote. The country was re-divided into seven archaeological districts, replacing the nine established by Kavvadias in 1886.

== After Kavvadias (1909–) ==
The Archaeological Service was expanded in 1911 by the founding of a Department of Restoration; in 1914, its first Byzantine and Christian Museum was established. A new archaeological law of 1932 gave the Service the right to issue three excavation permits to each of Greece's foreign archaeological institutes. In 1939, under the rule of the authoritarian prime minister Ioannis Metaxas, the service's director, Spyridon Marinatos, initiated legislation which banned women from joining the Archaeological Service or serving as the directors of museums and regional ephorates, as part of a broader scheme of misogynistic legislation promoted by the Metaxas government. Women had previously been rare in the Archaeological Service: two (Semni Karouzou and Eirene Varoucha-Christodoulopoulou) had been appointed since the First World War. The service's prestige and political independence gradually declined over the course of the 20th century. Following pressure from its ephors, John Papadimitriou was appointed in August 1958 to lead it. He was given the revived title of Ephor General in September 1961, and Christos Karouzos and Semni Karouzou were appointed to the same rank at the same time.

Under Papadimitriou, the service's autonomy was increased by moving it from the purview of the Ministry of Education to the Ministry of the Presidency, where it was supervised by the Prime Minister. This was also seen as a move to align the service's activity with the government's ambitions of increasing tourism, and three members of the Archaeological Council, including Marinatos and Nikolaos Kontoleon, resigned in protest. Papadimitrou resumed the publication of the Archaeological Bulletin, which had lapsed in 1938. Papadimitriou secured additional funding for the Archaeological Service and expanded its staffing. In addition to the thirty-eight archaeologists employed in early 1959, he hired seventeen new epimelites (junior archaeologists). Of the first five hired, four were women, as were seven of the second batch of twelve: this reversed Marinatos's ban on women in the service. (Note: Petrakos 1995, p. 130. On the Marinatos-era ban, see Kokkinidou & Nikolaidou 2006, p. 168.)

When the military junta known as the "Regime of the Colonels" seized power in 1967, they dismissed the director of the Archaeological Service, Ioannis Kontis, considering him politically unreliable. Marinatos, described in a modern study as "utterly devoted" to the regime, was reappointed to replace him, under the title of "Inspector General of the Services of Archaeology and Restoration". Marinatos promoted his own supporters and oversaw the sacking of many Greek archaeologists, making particular efforts to remove his political opponents, women – particularly Semni Karouzou, who was forced into exile in Italy and Germany – and adherents of progressive, non-traditional methodology. (Note: Marinatos used the label "New Archaeology" for such methods, but with little relation to its usual reference to what is now called processual archaeology.) After the fall of the junta, the service was again reorganised in 1982: the title of "ephor" was discontinued, as was the rank of Ephor General, though the title of "ephorate" remains in use for the service's regional archaeological units. In 1985, a reinterpretation of the 1932 archaeological law gave the Archaeological Service the right to approve joint projects (synergasia) between Greek archaeologists and foreign institutions, as well as to approve all foreign archaeologists working in Greece.

Before 2014, the archaeological ephorates of Greece were divided both by geographical region and the historical periods of the remains for which they were responsible. They were organised as follows:

- Thirty-nine Ephorates of Prehistoric and Classical Antiquities.
- Twenty-eight Ephorates of Byzantine Antiquities.
- Two Ephorates of Palaeoanthropology and Speleology.
- The Ephorate of Underwater Antiquities.
- The Ephorate of Antiquity Dealers and Private Archaeological Collections.

In 2014, under Presidential Decree no. 104, the regional ephorates were amalgamated into a single ephorate for each regional unit, covering all chronological periods. Olympia Vikatou became director of the Archaeological Service in 2023.

== Ephors General and directors ==
=== First period (1833–1909) ===
Portrait	Ephor General of Antiquities	Took office	Left office	Notes
Adolf Weissenberg	Adolf Weissenberg (Note: Sources are divided on whether to count Weissenberg as Ephor General: Papazarkadas does not, Petrakos does, others prevaricate (e.g. Fatsea, who describes his period in charge as a 'directorship' to which Ross 'succeeded'.)) (1790–1840)	1833	September 1834	Bavarian architect, appointed as 'ephor' for the antiquities of Greece by King Otto of Greece.
Ludwig Ross	Ludwig Ross (1806–1859)	1834	1836	German archaeologist and Classical scholar. The first to be appointed as Ephor General after the formal creation of the Ephorate under the Archaeological Law of 10/22 May.
Kyriakos Pittakis	Kyriakos Pittakis (1798–1863)	1836	1863	The first native Greek to hold the office. Styled as 'Ephor of the Central Public Museum' 1836–1843.
Panagiotis Efstratiadis	Panagiotis Efstratiadis (1815–1888)	1864	1884	Responsible for the construction of the first Acropolis Museum.
Panagiotis Stamatakis	Panagiotis Stamatakis (c.1840–1885)	1884	1885	Promoted less than a year before his death from malaria.
Panagiotis Kavvadias	Panagiotis Kavvadias (1850–1928)	1885	1909	Post abolished after his removal from office.

=== Director General of Antiquities and Historic Monuments ===
Portrait	Director General of Antiquities and Historic Monuments	Took office	Left office	Notes
Georgios Oikonomos	Georgios Oikonomos (1882–1951)	?	1937	Subsequently promoted to Director General of Antiquities, Letters and Arts.
Spyridon Marinatos	Spyridon Marinatos (1901–1974)	1937	1939	

=== Revival of the General Ephorate (1961–1982) ===
After the abolition of the position of Ephor General in 1909, the title was revived by the law 4177/1961 in 1961. Three positions at the same rank were created simultaneously.

Portrait	Ephor General of Antiquities	Took office	Left office	Notes
John Papadimitriou	John Papadimitriou (1904–1963)	1961	1963	Died in office.

Under the Regime of the Colonels, Spyridon Marinatos was appointed as head of the Greek archaeological service, and sometimes used the title of Ephor General:

Portrait	Ephor General of Antiquities	Took office	Left office	Notes
Spyridon Marinatos	Spyridon Marinatos (1901–1974)	1967	1973	Sacked by Dimitrios Ioannidis after the latter seized power in November 1973.

The rank of Ephor General was formally abolished once again by the law 1232/1982 in 1982.

=== Modern period ===
Portrait	Director of Antiquities and Cultural Heritage	Took office	Left office	Notes
Olympia Vikatou	Olympia Vikatou	2023		

== See also ==
- List of museums in Greece
- Central Archaeological Council
- Archaeological Society of Athens
- Ephorate of Underwater Antiquities

== Sources ==
- Antoniadis, Vyron; Kouremenos, Anna (2021). "Selective Memory and the Legacy of Archaeological Figures in Contemporary Athens: The Case of Heinrich Schliemann and Panagiotis Stamatakis". The Historical Review/La Revue Historique. 17: 181–204. doi:10.12681/hr.27071. hdl:10442/18299. S2CID 238067293.
- Archaeological Society of Athens (2003). Πρόσωπα της Εταιρείας: Kαββαδίας Παναγιώτης [Faces of the Society: Kavvadias Panagiotis]. Archaeological Society of Athens (in Greek). Archived from the original on 14 March 2012.
- Archaeological Society of Athens (2019). "Stamatakis Panagiotis". Archived from the original on 27 January 2019.
- Baelen, Jean (1958). "La porte Beulé et le prix de poésie de 1854" [The Beulé Gate and the 1854 Poetry Prize]. Bulletin de l'Association Guillaume Budé (in French). 1 (2): 92–116. doi:10.3406/bude.1958.3823. ISSN 2275-5160.
- Beresford, James (2016). "'Alchemy on the Acropolis: Turning Ancient Lead into Restitutionist Gold". The Historical Journal. 59 (3): 903–926. doi:10.1017/S0018246X15000242. ISSN 1469-5103. S2CID 163841256.
- Bosanquet, Robert Carr (1929). "Obituary Notice: Dr. Panagiotes Kavvadias". The Antiquaries Journal. 9 (1): 46–47. doi:10.1017/S0003581500012786. S2CID 246043687.
- Chatzidimitriou, Athina (2021). Ο Π. Ευστρατιάδης μεριμνά για τις ευβοϊκές αρχαιότητες: Aπό την διοικητική αλληλογραφία των ετών 1869–1870 [P. Efstratiadis Takes Care of the Euboean Antiquities: From the Administrative Correspondence of the Years 1869–1870]. In Matthiaou, Angelos; Chatzidimitriou, Athina (eds.). Πρακτικά Συμποσίου εις μνήμην Παναγιώτου Ευστρατιάδου (1815–1888) (in Greek). Athens: Greek Epigraphical Society. pp. 119–142. OL 35351400W.
- Christiansen, Jette; Nielsen, Anne Marie (2000). The Rediscovery of Greece: Denmark and Greece in the 19th Century. Ny Carlsberg Glyptotek. ISBN 978-87-7452-248-5.
- Coulson, William D. E. (1996). "Greek Archaeological Service". In de Grummond, Nancy (ed.). An Encyclopaedia of the History of Classical Archaeology. Abingdon: Routledge. pp. 535–536. ISBN 1-884964 80 X.
- Dyson, Stephen L. (2008). In Pursuit of Ancient Pasts: A History of Classical Archaeology in the Nineteenth and Twentieth Centuries. New Haven: Yale University Press. ISBN 978-0-300-13497-1.
- Fatsea, Irene (2017). "The Reception of J. J. Wincklemann During the Formative Years of the Modern Greek State (1832–1862)". In Cartledge, Paul; Voutsaki, Sofia (eds.). Ancient Monuments and Modern Identities: A Critical History of Archaeology in 19th and 20th Century Greece. London and New York: Routledge. pp. 62–76. ISBN 978-1-315-51344-7.
- Galanakis, Yannis; Nowak-Kemp, Malgosia (2013). "Ancient Greek Skulls in the Oxford University Museum, Part II: The Rhousopoulos–Rolleston Correspondence". Journal of the History of Collections. 25 (1): 1–17. doi:10.1093/jhc/fhq040.
- Galanakis, Yannis (2011). "An Unpublished Stirrup Jar from Athens and the 1871–2 Private Excavations in the Outer Kerameikos". Annual of the British School at Athens. 106: 167–200. doi:10.1017/S0068245411000074. JSTOR 41721707. S2CID 162544324.
- Glotz, Gustave (1928). "Éloge funèbre de M. Panagiotis Cavvadias, correspondant étranger de l'Académie" [Funerary Eulogy for Mr. Panagiotis Cavvadias, Overseas Correspondent of the Academy]. Comptes Rendus des Séances de l'Académie des Inscriptions et Belles-Lettres (in French). 72 (3): 269–273. Archived from the original (PDF) on 22 June 2022 – via Persée.
- Gunning, Lucia Patrizio (2009). The British Consular Service and the Collection of Antiquities in the Aegean. Ashgate Publishing, Ltd. ISBN 978-0-7546-6023-1.
- Hamilakis, Yannis (2007). The Nation and Its Ruins: Antiquity, Archaeology and National Imagination in Greece. Oxford University Press. ISBN 978-0-19-923038-9.
- Haugsted, Ida (1996). Dream and Reality: Danish Antiquaries, Architects and Artists in Greece. London: Archetype Publications. ISBN 978-1-873132-75-3.
- Kiminas, Demetrius (2009). The Ecumenical Patriarchate. San Bernardino: The Borgo Press. ISBN 978-1-4344-5876-6.
- Kokkinidou, Dimitra; Nikolaidou, Marianna (2006) [2004]. "On the Stage and Behind the Scenes: Greek Archaeology in Times of Dictatorship". In Galaty, Michael L.; Watkinson, Charles (eds.). Archaeology Under Dictatorship. New York: Springer. pp. 155–190. ISBN 0-306-48509-5.
- Kokkou, Angeliki (2009) [1977]. Η μέριμνα για τις αρχαιότητες στην Ελλάδα και η δημιουργία των πρώτων μουσείων [The Attitude Towards Antiquities in Greece and the Founding of the First Museums] (in Greek). Athens: Kapon Editions. ISBN 978-960-6878-11-4.
- Konstantinidi-Syvridi, Eleni; Paschalidis, Constantinos (2019). "The Unacknowledged Panayotis Stamatakis and his Invaluable Contribution to the Understanding of Grave Circle A at Mycenae". Archaeological Reports. 65: 111–126. doi:10.1017/S0570608419000061. JSTOR 26867451.
- Konstantinidi-Syvridi, Eleni (2020). "Panagiotis Stamatakis: 'Valuing the Ancient Monuments of Greece as Sacred Wealth...'". In Lagogianni-Georgakarakos, Maria; Koutsogiannis, Thodoris (eds.). These Are What We Fought For: Antiquities and the Greek War of Independence. Athens: Archaeological Resources Fund. pp. 276–289. ISBN 978-960-386-441-7.
- Kountouri, Elena; Masouridi, Stauroula (2013). Ιστορίες επί χάρτου: Μορφές και θέματα της Αρχαιολογίας στην Ελλάδα του 19ου αιώνα [Histories on Paper: Forms and Themes of Archaeology in Nineteenth-Century Greece] (PDF) (in Greek). Athens: Ministry of Culture and Sports. ISBN 978-960-386-138-6. Archived from the original (PDF) on 22 May 2023.
- Mallouchou-Tufano, Fani (2007). "The Vicissitudes of the Athenian Acropolis in the Nineteenth Century: From Castle to Monument". In Valavanis, Panos (ed.). Great Moments in Greek Archaeology. Athens: Kapon Press. pp. 36–57. ISBN 978-0-89236-910-2.
- Mantzourani, Eleni (2012). "Biography of Costis Davaras". In Betancourt, Philip; Mantzourani, Eleni (eds.). Philistor: Studies in Honor of Costis Davaras. Philadelphia: INSTAP Academic Press. pp. xxi–xxiv. ISBN 978-1-931534-65-9.
- Nikolaidou, Marianna; Kokkinidou, Dimitra (2005). "Greek Women in Archaeology: An Untold Story". In Díaz-Andreu, Magarita; Sorensen, Marie Louise Stig (eds.). Excavating Women: A History of Women in European Archaeology. Abingdon: Routledge. pp. 242–243. ISBN 978-1-134-72775-9.
- Palyvou, Clairy (2014). "Spyridon Marinatos 1901–74". In Fagan, Brian (ed.). The Great Archaeologists. London: Thames and Hudson. pp. 158–160. ISBN 978-0-500-05181-8.
- Pantos, Pantos A. (2008). "Outline of 'Archaeology and the Archaeological Profession in Greece'".
- Pantos, Pantos A. (2014). "Archaeological Legislation during the 19th Century. From Georg Ludwig von Maurer to Panagiotis Kavvadias".
- Papazarkadas, Nikolaos (2014). "Epigraphy in Early Modern Greece". Journal of the History of Collections. 26 (3): 399–412. doi:10.1093/jhc/fhu018.
- Petrakos, Vasileios (1982). Δοκίµιο για την αρχαιολογική νοµοθεσία [Essay on Archaeological Legislation] (in Greek). Athens: Archaeological Resources and Expropriations Fund (Ταμείο Αρχαιολογικών Πόρων και Απαλλοτριώσεων).
- Petrakos, Vasileios (1987). H Εν Aθήναις Aρχαιολογική Eταιρεία: H ιστορία των 150 χρόνων της [The Archaeological Society of Athens: The History of Its 150 Years] (PDF). Library of the Archaeological Society of Athens (in Greek). Vol. 104. Athens: Archaeological Society of Athens. OL 47766951M.
- Petrakos, Vasileios (1989). Παρωχημένη ἐπικαιρότης (Ὁ Κυριακὸς Σ. Πιττάκης καὶ τὰ ἀρχαῖα τῆς ᾿Ελλάδος) [Out of Date (Kyriakos S. Pittakis and the Antiquities of Greece] (PDF). Mentor (in Greek). 6: 22–26. ISSN 1105-1205. Archived from the original (PDF) on 8 January 2022.
- Petrakos, Vasileios (1995). Η περιπέτεια της ελληνικής αρχαιολογίας στον βίο του Χρήστου Καρούζου [The Adventure of Greek Archaeology in the Life of Christos Karouzos] (PDF) (in Greek). Athens: Archaeological Society of Athens. ISBN 960-7036-47-6. Archived from the original (PDF) on 15 October 2021.
- Petrakos, Vasileios (1997). Ιωάννης Κ. Παπαδημητρίου [John K. Papadimitriou]. Έπαινος Ιωάννου Κ. Παπαδημητρίου [Praise of John K. Papadimitriou] (PDF). Library of the Archaeological Society of Athens (in Greek). Vol. 168. Archaeological Society of Athens. pp. 9–51. ISBN 960-7036-70-0.
- Petrakos, Vasileios (1998). Η ελληνική αντίληψη για τα μνημεία από τον Κυριακό Σ. Πιττάκη έως σήμερα [The Greek Perception of Monuments from Kyriakos S. Pittakis to Today] (PDF). Mentor. 47: 65–112. Archived from the original (PDF) on 20 September 2024.
- Petrakos, Vasileios (2004). Η απαρχή της ελληνικής αρχαιολογίας και η ίδρυση της Αρχαιολογικής Εταιρείας [The Beginning of Greek Archaeology and the Foundation of the Archaeological Society] (PDF). Mentor. 73: 111–220. ISSN 1105-1205. Archived from the original (PDF) on 22 September 2022.
- Petrakos, Vasileios (2007). "The Stages of Greek Archaeology". In Valavanis, Panos (ed.). Great Moments in Greek Archaeology. Athens: Kapon Press. pp. 16–35. ISBN 978-0-89236-910-2.
- Petrakos, Vasileios (2011). Η ελληνική αυταπάτη του Λουδοβίκου Ross [Ludwig Ross's Greek Delusion] (PDF). Βιβλιοθήκη της εν Αθήναις Αρχαιολογικής Εταιρείας (Library of the Archaeological Society of Athens) (in Greek). Vol. 262. Athens: Archaeological Society of Athens.
- Raphael, Frederic (2019). Antiquity Matters. New Haven: Yale University Press. doi:10.12987/9780300231748-002. ISBN 9780300215373. JSTOR j.ctv1bvnfc6.
- Theodoropoulou-Polychroniadis, Zetta (2015). Sounion Revisited: The Sanctuaries of Poseidon and Athena at Sounion in Attica. Oxford: Archaeopress. ISBN 978-1-78491-155-3.
- Tomlinson, Richard Allan (2013). "Archaeology". In Wilson, Nigel (ed.). Encyclopedia of Ancient Greece. London: Taylor & Francis. pp. 71–73. ISBN 978-1-135-94206-9.
- Thompson, Homer S. (1975). "Spyridon Marinatos: November 4, 1901–October 1, 1974". Archaeology. 28 (1): 59–60. JSTOR 41685618.
- Traill, David (2012). "Schliemann's Mycenae excavations through the eyes of Stamatakis". In Korres, George Styl; Karadimas, Nektarios; Flouda, George (eds.). Archaeology and Heinrich Schliemann. A Century after his Death. Αssessments and Prospects. Myth – History – Science (PDF). Athens. pp. 79–84. ISBN 978-960-93-3929-2.
- Tsouli, Chrysanthi (2020). "Kyriakos Pittakis: Sincere Patriot, Unwearied Guard and Vigilant Εphor of Αntiquities". In Lagogianni-Georgakarakos, Maria; Koutsogiannis, Thodoris (eds.). These Are What We Fought For: Antiquities and the Greek War of Independence. Athens: Archaeological Resources Fund. pp. 266–275. ISBN 978-960-386-441-7.
- Vasilikou, Dora (2011). Το χρονικό της ανασκαφής των Μυκηνών, 1870–1878 [The Chronicle of the Excavation of Mycenae, 1870–1878] (PDF) (in Greek). Athens: Archaeological Society of Athens. ISBN 978-960-8145-87-0. Archived from the original (PDF) on 7 December 2022.
- Voutsaki, Sofia (2003). "Archaeology and the Construction of the Past in Nineteenth Century Greece". In Hokwerda, Hero (ed.). Constructions of the Greek Past: Identity and Historical Consciousness from Antiquity to the Present. Groningen: Egbert Forsten. pp. 231–255. ISBN 978-90-04-49546-3.
- Voutsaki, Sofia (2017). "Introduction". In Cartledge, Paul; Voutsaki, Sofia (eds.). Ancient Monuments and Modern Identities: A Critical History of Archaeology in 19th and 20th Century Greece. London and New York: Routledge. pp. 1–23. ISBN 9781315513447.
