= Adolf Weissenberg =

Bavarian architect and archaeologist (1790–1840)

Adolf Weissenberg (Note: Sources variously give Weissenberg's first name as Adolf or Anton, and his last name as Weissenberg, Weissenburg or Weissenborn.) (1790–1840) was a Bavarian architect and archaeologist. He was appointed by Otto of Greece as ephor of antiquities, overseeing all archaeology and archaeological sites in Greece, in 1833, but forced to resign in September 1834.

== Career ==
Weissenberg was born in 1790. From 1822, he lived in Rome. In June 1833, he was appointed as "Ephor of Antiquities" (Greek: Ἔφορος τῶν ἀρχαιοτήτων, romanized: eforos ton archaiotiton) with responsibility for "the conservation, discovery and collection of the archaeological treasures of the kingdom". Three others were appointed with the title of 'sub-ephor' (Greek: ὑποέφορος, romanized: hupoeforos): Kyriakos Pittakis, for central and northern Greece; Ludwig Ross, for the Peloponnese, and Ioannis Kokkonis for the Aegean Islands.

On 13 February [O.S. 1 February] 1834, (Note: Greece adopted the Gregorian calendar in 1923; 28 February [O.S. 15 February] was followed by 1 March. In this article, this date and all subsequent dates are given in the 'New Style' Gregorian calendar, while dates before it are given in the 'Old Style' Julian calendar.) Weissenberg was appointed to lead the Greek Archaeological Service, which had notionally been established by Governor Ioannis Kapodistrias in 1829 but lacked a formal administrative structure until then. Weissenberg's short tenure saw the passage of the Archaeological Law of 10/22 May 1834, which named all antiquities in Greece as the "national property of all the Greeks", asserted the ownership of the state over all archaeological sites not already on private land and created the core administrative structure of the Archaeological Service. Weissenberg drafted the law alongside the regent Georg Ludwig von Maurer, and it was based upon a similar law of the Papal States.

Weissenberg was accused by Ross of lacking interest in antiquities, and had also attracted the enmity of Josef Ludwig von Armansperg, head of the regency council, by trying to organise opposition to his government alongside von Maurer. Both Weissenberg and von Maurer were sacked (along with Kokkonis) in September 1834 and recalled to Bavaria. In Weissenberg's stead, Ross was named as Ephor General of Antiquities, with Pittakis and Athanasios Iatridis as his assistants. Weissenberg died in 1840.

== Bibliography ==
- Haugsted, Ida (1996). Dream and Reality: Danish Antiquaries, Architects and Artists in Greece. London: Archetype Publications. ISBN 978-1-873132-75-3.
- Kiminas, Demetrius (2009). The Ecumenical Patriarchate. San Bernardino: The Borgo Press. ISBN 978-1-4344-5876-6.
- Petrakos, Vasileios (1998). Η ελληνική αντίληψη για τα μνημεία από τον Κυριακό Σ. Πιττάκη έως σήμερα [The Greek Attitude Towards Monuments from Kyriakos S. Pittakis to Today]. Mentor. 47: 65–112.
- Petrakos, Vasileios (2007). "The Stages of Greek Archaeology". In Valavanis, Panos (ed.). Great Moments in Greek Archaeology. Athens: Kapon Press. pp. 16–35. ISBN 978-0-89236-910-2.
- Petrakos, Vasileios (2009). Η εν Αθήναις Αρχαιολογική Εταιρεία: Οι Αρχαιολόγοι και οι Ανασκαφές 1837–2011 (Κατάλογος Εκθέσεως) [The Archaeological Society of Athens: The Archaeologists and the Excavations 1837–2011 (Exhibition Catalogue] (in Greek). Athens: Archaeological Society of Athens. ISBN 978-960-8145-86-3.
- Petrakos, Vasileios (2011). Η ελληνική αυταπάτη του Λουδοβίκου Ross [Ludwig Ross's Greek Delusion] (PDF). Βιβλιοθήκη της εν Αθήναις Αρχαιολογικής Εταιρείας (Library of the Archaeological Society of Athens) (in Greek). Vol. 262. Athens: Archaeological Society of Athens.
- Petrakos, Vasileios (2022). Παναγιώτης Α. Σταματάκης: βίος και έργο [Panagiotis A. Stamatakis: Life and Work]. Library of the Archaeological Society of Athens (in Greek). Vol. 343. Athens: Archaeological Society of Athens.
- Tomlinson, Richard Allan (2013). "Archaeology". In Wilson, Nigel (ed.). Encyclopedia of Ancient Greece. London: Taylor & Francis. pp. 71–73. ISBN 978-1-135-94206-9.
