= Eirene Varoucha-Christodoulopoulou =

Greek archaeologist and numismatist (1896–1979)

- Ειρήνη Βαρούχα-Χριστοδουλοπούλου
- Eirene Varoucha-Christodoulopoulou in 1937
- Born: 10 December 1896; Paros
- Died: 31 March 1979 (aged 82); Athens

Academic background
- Education: University of Athens

Academic work
- Discipline: Archaeology
- Sub-discipline: Numismatics
- Institutions: Greek Archaeological Service, Numismatic Museum of Athens

Eirene Varoucha-Christodoulopoulou (Greek: Ειρήνη Βαρούχα-Χριστοδουλοπούλου; 10 December 1896 – 31 March 1979) was a Greek archaeologist and numismatist.

== Early life and education ==
Eirene Varoucha was born on the Greek island of Paros on December 10th 1896, but at the age of nine left to attend schools in Cairo, Egypt and then Aigion, Greece. She subsequently studied at the Athens Conservatoire (1910-11) and then studied archaeology at the University of Athens. She graduated in 1918 as one of the first women to graduate from this university with a degree in archaeology, and in 1921 joined the Greek Archaeological Service - one of the first women (along with Semni Karouzou) to do so. From 1927-30 she studied for a postgraduate degree in numismatics in Berlin on a Humboldt Fellowship.

== Career ==
In the early stages of her work for the Archaeological Service, Varoucha-Christodoulopoulou took part in an excavation on Paros, and published the discoveries of tombs belonging to the Cycladic (Bronze Age) and Hellenistic periods. In 1921 she was appointed to the Numismatic Museum of Athens, where she continued to work for over 40 years, until her retirement in 1963; from 1930 she held the title of Ephor of Antiquities. Her work for the museum included a period as acting Director of the Museum in 1939 (although she was denied the permanent appointment due to her gender); she oversaw the transfer of the museum's collections to the Bank of Greece for safe-keeping during World War II and, after the war, their redisplay in a gallery of the National Archaeological Museum. Her numismatic publications included publishing coins found during excavations (including on Paros and at the sanctuary of Dodona) or acquired by the museum, as well as studies of the numismatic evidence relating to the Chremonidean War, which Athens and Sparta, in alliance with Ptolemaic Egypt, unsuccessfully fought against Macedonia in 266/5-263/2 BCE.

== Personal life ==
Eirene Varoucha-Christodoulopoulou was married to Pindaros Christodoulopoulos, professor of political economy at the University of Athens; they had a daughter, Avgi. Varoucha-Christodoulopoulou died in Athens on March 31st 1979.

== Selected publications ==
- Varoucha, Eirene (1925–1926). Κυκλαδικοί τάφοι της Πάρου [Cycladic Tombs of Paros]. AEph (in Greek): 98–114.
- Varoucha-Christodoulopoulou, Eirene (1955). Νοµίσµατα ανασκαφών Δωδώνης [Coins from the Excavations of Dodona]. PAAH (in Greek). 110: 174–180.
- Varoucha-Christodoulopoulou, Eirene (1965). "Les témoignages numismatiques sur la guerre chrémonidienne" [The Numismatic Evidence on the Chremonidean War]. Congresso internazionale di numismatica: Roma, 11–16 settembre 1961 (in French). Rome: Istituto Italiano di Numismatica.
