= Christos Karouzos =

Greek archaeologist (1900–1967)

- Χρήστος Καρούζος
- Born: 14 March 1900; Amfissa, Greece
- Died: March 30, 1967 (aged 67)
- Spouse: Semni Papaspyridi (m. 1930)

Academic background
- Education: University of Athens
- Influences: Ernst Buschor; Eduard Schwartz; Christos Tsountas; Paul Wolters

Academic work
- Discipline: Greek archaeology
- Institutions: Greek Archaeological Service; National Archaeological Museum, Athens

Christos Karouzos (Greek: Χρήστος Καρούζος; 14 March 1900 – 30 March 1967) was a Greek archaeologist. Born in Amfissa, he was educated at the University of Athens, where he was taught by Christos Tsountas. He joined the Greek Archaeological Service in 1919, where he developed a reputation as an innovator and a moderniser, working to promote the use of the everyday Demotic dialect of Greek against the state-imposed dominance of the artificial, literary Katharevousa dialect. His early postings included work in the museums of Thebes and Volos, and at the Acropolis Museum in Athens.

Karouzos travelled to Germany on a Humboldt Scholarship in 1928, and married his former university classmate, Semni Papaspyridi, in 1930. The two frequently collaborated in archaeological and museum work. During the Second World War, he worked to conceal Greek antiquities from Axis forces and resigned his membership of the German Archaeological Institute at Athens in protest of the German occupation of Athens. He was made director of the National Archaeological Museum of Athens in 1942, declined the directorship of the Archaeological Service in 1944, and was forced to resign from the service in 1948, due to suspicions that he held communist beliefs. He returned in 1949 and directed the National Archaeological Museum until shortly before his death in 1967.

== Early life and career ==
Christos Karouzos was born in Amfissa on 14 March 1900. (Note: Devambez 1969, p. 115; "Karouzos, Christos". Academy of Athens.) In his youth, he was a member of the Educational League, a group advocating for the value of Demotic Greek against the state-imposed dominance of the artificial, literary Katharevousa dialect. He studied philology and archaeology at the University of Athens, where he won a scholarship in 1916 ahead of the future archaeologist Spyridon Marinatos: Marinatos's resentment fuelled a lifelong rivalry between the two. Among Karouzos's teachers was the archaeologist Christos Tsountas; his fellow students included Semni Papaspyridi. Karouzos passed the selection exams to join the Greek Archaeological Service in 1919, and was awarded his degree in 1921.

Karouzos became known as a leading advocate of innovation in archaeology: along with Papaspyridi and Yannis Miliadis, he advocated the incorporation of liberal and Marxist ideas into the discipline, including the use of Demotic. His first posting with the Archaeological Service was to Thebes, where he took part in excavations at the "Pyre of Heracles" on Mount Oeta under Nikolaos Pappadakis. While in Thebes, he compiled a catalogue of the museum's collection in Demotic rather than Katharevousa: the government ministry responsible for archaeology refused to buy any copies of it. In 1935, he was transferred from Thebes to a less attractive posting in Volos in Thessaly: this followed rumours that Lina Tsaldari, the wife of the prime minister Panagis Tsaldaris, had called him "the worst archaeologist in the service". Karouzos subsequently worked in Attica (where he was a curator at the Acropolis Museum under Antonios Keramopoulos), at Sparta and in the Cyclades.

In 1928, along with Papaspyridi, he was awarded a Humboldt Scholarship to study at the Ludwig-Maximilians-Universität München and at the Humboldt University of Berlin. There, he was taught by Paul Wolters, Carl Weickert, Eduard Schwartz, Ernst Buschor, and Wilhelm Pinder. According to Papaspyridi, their experience of Renaissance and modern art during their studies here gave both scholars "a new Romantic passion" for the works of antiquity. Following their return to Greece, Papaspyridi (thereafter known as Semni Karouzou) and Karouzos married in 1930. Between 1928 and 1933, he worked on a publication of the Artemision Bronze, a statue of Poseidon or Zeus found in a shipwreck off Cape Artemision in 1926. In 1929, he submitted his doctoral disseration: he was supported in his examination by Keramopoulos, but the thesis was rejected by the conservative principal examiner, Apostolos Arvanitopoulos. He submitted the dissertation again in 1939: this time, it passed with the support of Georgios Oikonomos.

== Second World War and later career ==
Following the outbreak of war with Italy in October 1940, Karouzos, Karouzou, a fellow Greek archaeologist named Ioanna Constantinou and the Austrian archaeologist Otto Walter worked to conceal the artefacts held in the National Archaeological Museum of Athens: Karouzos undertook similar work at the museums of Thebes, the Kerameikos, Piraeus and Chalcis. Following the German occupation of Athens in 1941, Karouzos, along with his wife, resigned his membership of the German Archaeological Institute at Athens. He was made director of the National Archaeological Museum in 1942.

Marinatos made a public address on 28 October 1941, commemorating the dictator Metaxas's defiance of the Italian dictator Benito Mussolini the previous year. In it, he praised both Metaxas, who had died that January, and the exiled George II, who had made Metaxas prime minister after his own restoration in a military coup led by Georgios Kondylis. (Note: Kokkinidou & Nikolaidou 2006, p. 167; Petrakos 2015, p. 35. For the relationship between George, Metaxas and Kondylis, see Koliopoulos & Veremis 2010, p. 103.) Despite the ongoing Axis occupation, his comments were broadcast on national radio and garnered a strong reaction from the Greek public: Karouzos, alongside Miliadis, wrote to the collaborationist Prime Minister, Konstantinos Logothetopoulos, criticising Marinatos's conduct. (Note: Petrakos 2015, pp. 35–36. For Kordatos's politics, see Mishkova 2022, p. 130.) Karouzos also wrote to the Ministry of Culture in November 1944, writing that all of Greece's museums were ruined beyond repair, and would have to be restored from nothing.

In the autumn of 1944, Karouzos was offered the position of director of the Archaeological Service: he declined it, and recommended Miliadis for the task. In 1948, during the Greek Civil War between royalist and communist forces, Karouzos was forced to resign from his position in the Archaeological Service due to suspicions that he held communist beliefs. He was reappointed to direct the National Archaeological Museum in 1949 and tasked with reorganising it, alongside Karouzou. In 1955, he was elected a member of the Academy of Athens, Greece's national academy.

The prestige and independence of the Archaeological Service had gradually declined over the course of the 20th century. Following pressure from members of the Archaeological Service, John Papadimitriou was appointed in August 1958 to lead it. He was given the revived title of Ephor General, previously used by Panagiotis Kavvadias until 1909, in September 1961, and Karouzos and Karouzou were appointed to the same rank at the same time. Karouzos was moved from his museum position in 1964, and suffered a heart attack in December 1966; he died of a second on 30 March 1967.

In addition to his membership of the German Archaeological Institute, Karouzos received an honorary doctorate from the University of Basel, and was a member of the British Society for the Promotion of Hellenic Studies, the Austrian Archaeological Institute, and the Bavarian Academy of Sciences and Humanities, as well as a member of the council of the Archaeological Society of Athens.

== Works cited ==
- Aravantinos, Vassilios (2010). The Archaeological Museum of Thebes. John S. Latsis Public Benefit Foundation. ISBN 978-960-89339-8-9.
- Catapoti, Despina (2012). "A Nationalist Palimpsest: Authoring the History of the Greek Nation Through Alternative Museum Narratives" (PDF). In Poulot, Dominique; Bodenstein, Felicity; Lanzarote, José María (eds.). Great Narratives of the Past. Traditions and Revisions in National Museums. Linköping University Electronic Press. pp. 133–168.
- Devambez, Pierre (1969). "Christos Karouzos (1900–1967)". Revue Archéologique (1): 115–116. JSTOR 41755535.
- Kokkinidou, Dimitra; Nikolaidou, Marianna (2006) [2004]. "On the Stage and Behind the Scenes: Greek Archaeology in Times of Dictatorship". In Galaty, Michael L.; Watkinson, Charles (eds.). Archaeology Under Dictatorship. New York: Springer. pp. 155–190. ISBN 0306485095.
- Koliopoulos, John S; Veremis, Thanos M. (2010). Modern Greece: A History Since 1821. Chichester: Wiley-Blackwell. ISBN 9781444314830.
- Mishkova, Diana (2022). Rival Byzantiums: Empire and Identity in Southeastern Europe. Cambridge: Cambridge University Press. doi:10.1017/9781108759557. ISBN 9781108499903.
- Möbius, Hans (1968). "Christos Karusos". Gnomon (in German). 40 (5): 524–526. JSTOR 27684515.
- Nicotra, Laura (2004). Archeologia al femminile (in Italian). Rome: "Erma" di Bretschneider. ISBN 978-88-8265-284-5.
- Petrakos, Vasileios (1995). Η περιπέτεια της ελληνικής αρχαιολογίας στον βίο του Χρήστου Καρούζου [The Adventure of Greek Archaeology in the Life of Christos Karouzos] (PDF) (in Greek). Athens: Archaeological Society of Athens. ISBN 960-7036-47-6. Archived from the original (PDF) on 15 October 2021.
- Petrakos, Vasileios (2007). "The Stages of Greek Archaeology". In Valavanis, Panos (ed.). Great Moments in Greek Archaeology. Athens: Kapon Press. pp. 16–35. ISBN 978-0-89236-910-2.
- Petrakos, Vasileios (2015). Ὁ πολιτικὸς Μαρινᾶτος [The Political Marinatos] (PDF). Mentor. 114: 16–49.
- Robinson, Henry S. (1967). "Report of the Director". American School of Classical Studies at Athens: Eighty-Sixth Annual Report (PDF). Princeton: American School of Classical Studies at Athens. pp. 22–29.
