= Central Archaeological Council =

Supreme advisory body for the protection of antiquities in Greece

The Central Archaeological Council and Museums Council (Greek: Κεντρικό Αρχαιολογικό Συμβούλιο και Συμβούλιο Μουσείων, romanized: Kentrikó Archaiologikó Symvoúlio kai Symvoúlio Mouseíon), commonly known simply by its older abbreviation KAS (Κ.Α.Σ.), is the supreme advisory body for all matters pertaining to the "protection of antiquities and cultural patrimony in general" in Greece.

Its present form and functions are regulated by Law 3028/2002, but its origins date back to 1834, when the Central Committee (Κεντρική Ἐπιτροπὴ, Kentrikí Epitropí) of the Greek Archaeological Service was established. This was renamed to Archaeological Committee (Ἀρχαιολογικὴ Ἐπιτροπὴ, Archaiologikí Epitropí) and given broader powers in 1899, to Archaeological Council (Ἀρχαιολογικόν Συμβούλιον, Archaiologikón Symvoúlion) in 1910, and to Central Archaeological Council (Κεντρικό Αρχαιολογικό Συμβούλιο, Kentrikó Archaiologikó Symvoúlio) in 1977.

Its members are selected among scientists, educators, artists, and archaeologists. It is charged with the preservation and restoration of cultural monuments, the management of archaeological sites, the establishment and management of museums, and the supervision of research and excavation activities both by the local ephorates of antiquities as well as by the foreign archaeological institutes active in Greece.
