= Ephor (archaeology) =

Greek Archaeological Service official

In Greece, ephor (Greek: έφορος, romanized: ephoros, lit. 'overseer') is a title formerly given to the head of an archaeological ephorate (εφορεία, ephoria), or archaeological unit. It was first used in 1829 and continued in use for archaeological officers until 1982: the name "ephorate" continues to be used for archaeological units.

Most ephorates are responsible for a particular region of Greece. However, the Ephorate of Underwater Antiquities has jurisdiction across the whole of Greece, as does the Ephorate of Private Archaeological Collections, while two Ephorates of Palaeoanthropology and Speleology exist, one for northern and one for southern Greece.

== History ==
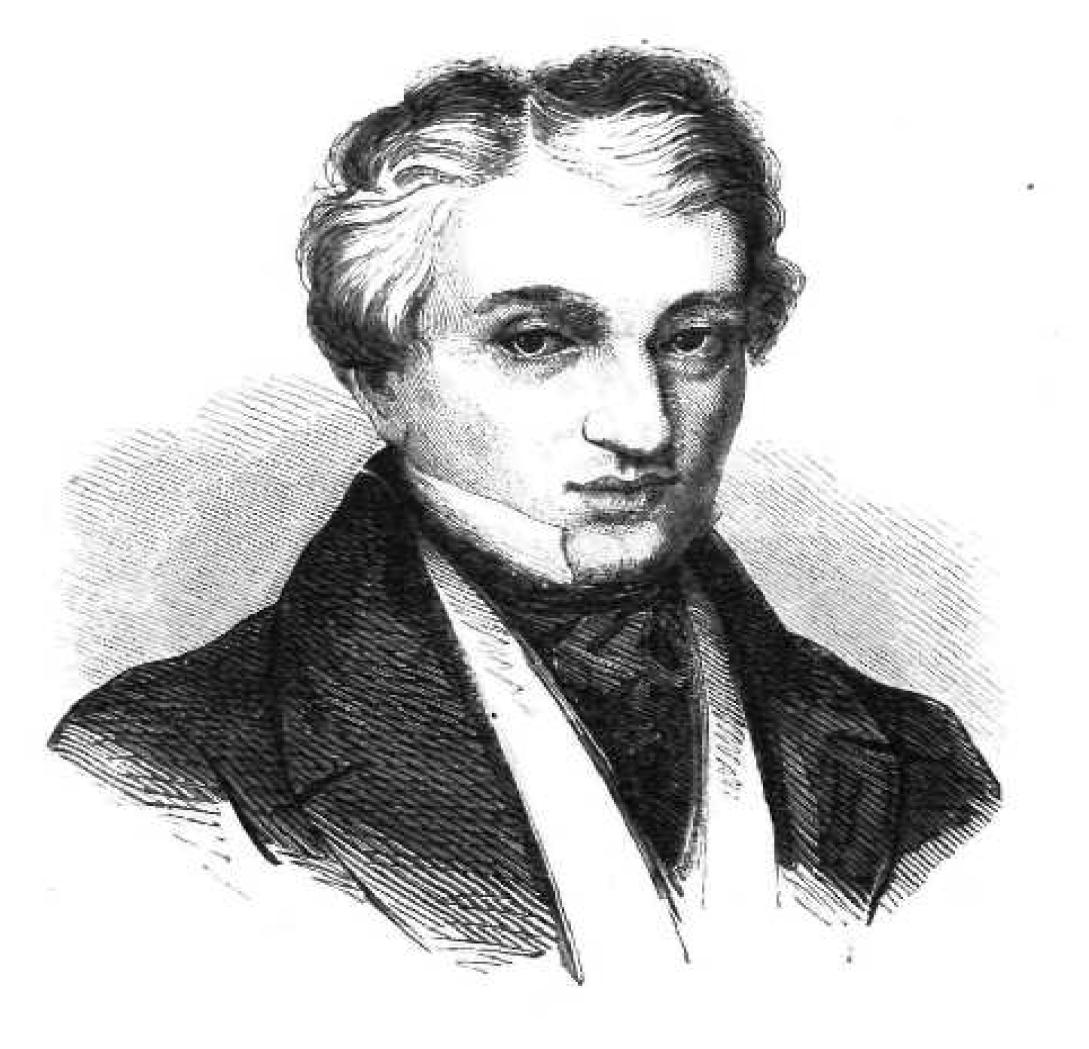
Andreas Moustoxydis, who held the title of 'ephor' as director of the National Archaeological Museum on Aigina.

The title of ephor was first used in archaeological circles for Andreas Moustoxydis, who was appointed by Ioannis Kapodistrias in October 1829 as 'Director and Ephor' of the first national archaeological museum, then on the island of Aegina. In 1834, the Greek Archaeological Service was established by the Archaeological Law of 10/22 May, which also formally established the position of Ephor General of Antiquities (Greek: Γενικὸς Ἔφορος τῶν Ἀρχαιοτήτων), first held by Ludwig Ross after the abortive tenure of the architect Adolf Weissenberg. Ross had previously held the title of 'Ephor' of Antiquities of the Peloponnese, from 1833.

Until the mid-1870s, the Greek Archaeological Service consisted entirely of the Ephor General himself, sometimes supported by a personal assistant. In 1871, the privately organised Archaeological Society of Athens, which had taken on some of the state's responsibility for excavating and managing cultural heritage, began to appoint its own travelling ephors, known as 'apostles'. The primary duties of these 'apostles' were to conduct archaeological work throughout Greece, to combat archaeological looting and the illegal trade in antiquities, and to persuade citizens to hand over antiquities, particularly those acquired illegally, to the care of the state. The first of these was Panagiotis Stamatakis, whose work formed the basis for several public archaeological collections throughout Greece; he was followed in 1874 by Athanasios Dimitriadis, in 1880 by Dimitrios Philios, in 1882 by Christos Tsountas, in 1884 by Vasilios Leonardos, in 1891 by Andreas Skias and in 1894 by Konstantinos Kourouniotis. From the 1870s, the Archaeological Service began to employ its own ephors, expanding continuously until the early 1910s. These ephors generally had responsibility for a particular region of Greece: Stamatakis, for example, was recruited in 1875 to oversee antiquities in Central Greece.

In 1909, following the Goudi coup and the so-called "mutiny of the superintendents" among the ephors of the Archaeological Service, the Ephor General Panagiotis Kavvadias was removed from office, and the post of Ephor General abolished. Thereafter, the Archaeological Service gradually declined in prestige and independence; its leaders were entirely appointed from university professors, rather than officers of the service, until 1958. Following pressure from members of the Archaeological Service, John Papadimitriou was appointed to lead it, initially with the title of director of antiquities, in August 1958. This coincided with a revival of the service's activities and status, and Papadimitriou was appointed to the revived position of Ephor General, in September 1961. Christos Karouzos and Semni Karouzou were appointed to the same rank at the same time. The title was occasionally used by Spyridon Marinatos, appointed to lead the Archaeological Service during the Regime of the Colonels, then abolished again in 1982.

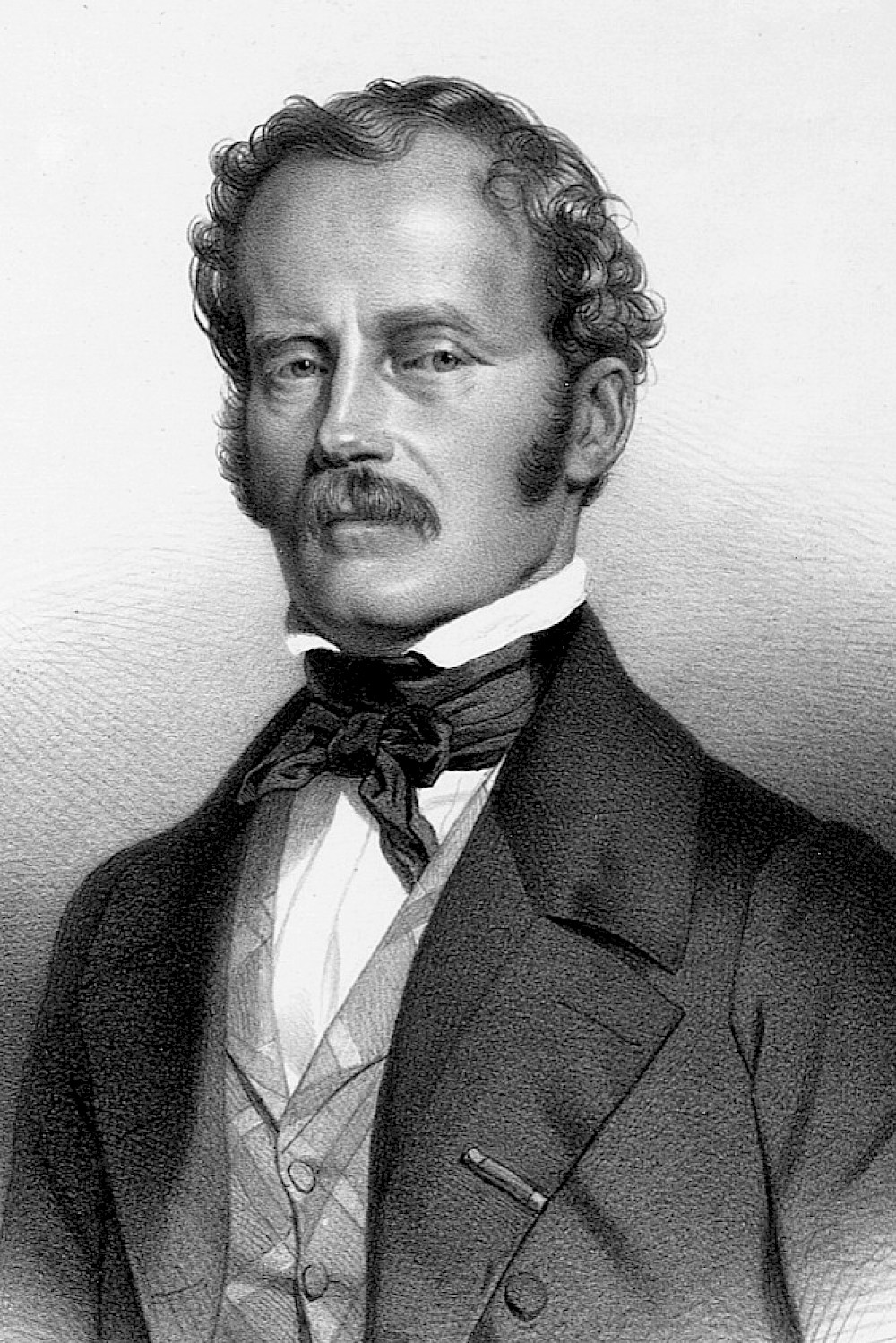
The German archaeologist Ludwig Ross, the first Ephor General of Antiquities of Greece.

Though the title of ephorate remains for the regional units, the title of ephor remains out of use. The professional head of the Greek Archaeological Service is typically referred to as the "director-general" or "General Inspector" of Antiquities.

=== Reorganisation of 2014 ===
Before 2014, the archaeological ephorates of Greece were divided both by geographical region and the historical periods of the remains for which they were responsible. They were organised as follows:

- Thirty-nine Ephorates of Prehistoric and Classical Antiquities.
- Twenty-eight Ephorates of Byzantine Antiquities.
- Two Ephorates of Palaeoanthropology and Speleology.
- The Ephorate of Underwater Antiquities.
- The Ephorate of Antiquity Dealers and Private Archaeological Collections.

In 2014, under Presidential Decree no. 104, the regional ephorates were amalgamated into a single ephorate for each regional unit, covering all chronological periods.

== List of Ephors General of Antiquities ==
=== First period (1833–1909) ===
Portrait	Ephor General of Antiquities	Took office	Left office	Notes
Adolf Weissenberg	Adolf Weissenberg (Note: Sources are divided on whether to count Weissenberg as Ephor General: Papazarkadas does not, Petrakos does, others prevaricate (e.g. Fatsea, who describes his period in charge as a 'directorship' to which Ross 'succeeded'.)) (1790–1840)	1833	September 1834	Bavarian architect, appointed as 'ephor' for the antiquities of Greece by King Otto of Greece.
Ludwig Ross	Ludwig Ross (1806–1859)	1834	1836	German archaeologist and Classical scholar. The first to be appointed as Ephor General after the formal creation of the Ephorate under the Archaeological Law of 10/22 May.
Kyriakos Pittakis	Kyriakos Pittakis (1798–1863)	1836	1863	The first native Greek to hold the office. Styled as 'Ephor of the Central Public Museum' 1836–1843. Responsible for the first excavation and restoration of the Lion Gate at Mycenae.
Panagiotis Efstratiadis	Panagiotis Efstratiadis (1815–1888)	1864	1884	Responsible for the construction of the first Acropolis Museum.
Panagiotis Stamatakis	Panagiotis Stamatakis (c.1840–1885)	1884	1885	Promoted barely a year before his death from malaria.
Panagiotis Kavvadias	Panagiotis Kavvadias (1850–1928)	1885	1909	Directed the excavations of Epidaurus. Post abolished after his removal from office.

=== Revival of the General Ephorate (1961–1981) ===
After the abolition of the position of Ephor General in 1909, the title was revived by the law 4177/1961 in 1961. Three positions at the same rank were created simultaneously.

Portrait	Ephor General of Antiquities	Took office	Left office	Notes
Christos Karouzos	Christos Karouzos (1900–1967)	1961	17 August 1964	
Semni Karouzou	Semni Karouzou (1897–1994)	1961	17 August 1964	The first woman to be employed by the Greek Archaeological Service, and the only one to hold the rank of Ephor General.
John Papadimitriou	John Papadimitriou (1904–1963)	1961	1963	Died in office.

Under the Regime of the Colonels, Spyridon Marinatos was appointed as head of the Greek archaeological service, and sometimes used the title of Ephor General:

Portrait	Ephor General of Antiquities	Took office	Left office	Notes
Spyridon Marinatos	Spyridon Marinatos (1901–1974)	1967	1973	Sacked by Dimitrios Ioannidis after the latter seized power in November 1973.

The rank of Ephor General was formally abolished once again by the law 1232/1982 in 1982.

== Current ephorates ==
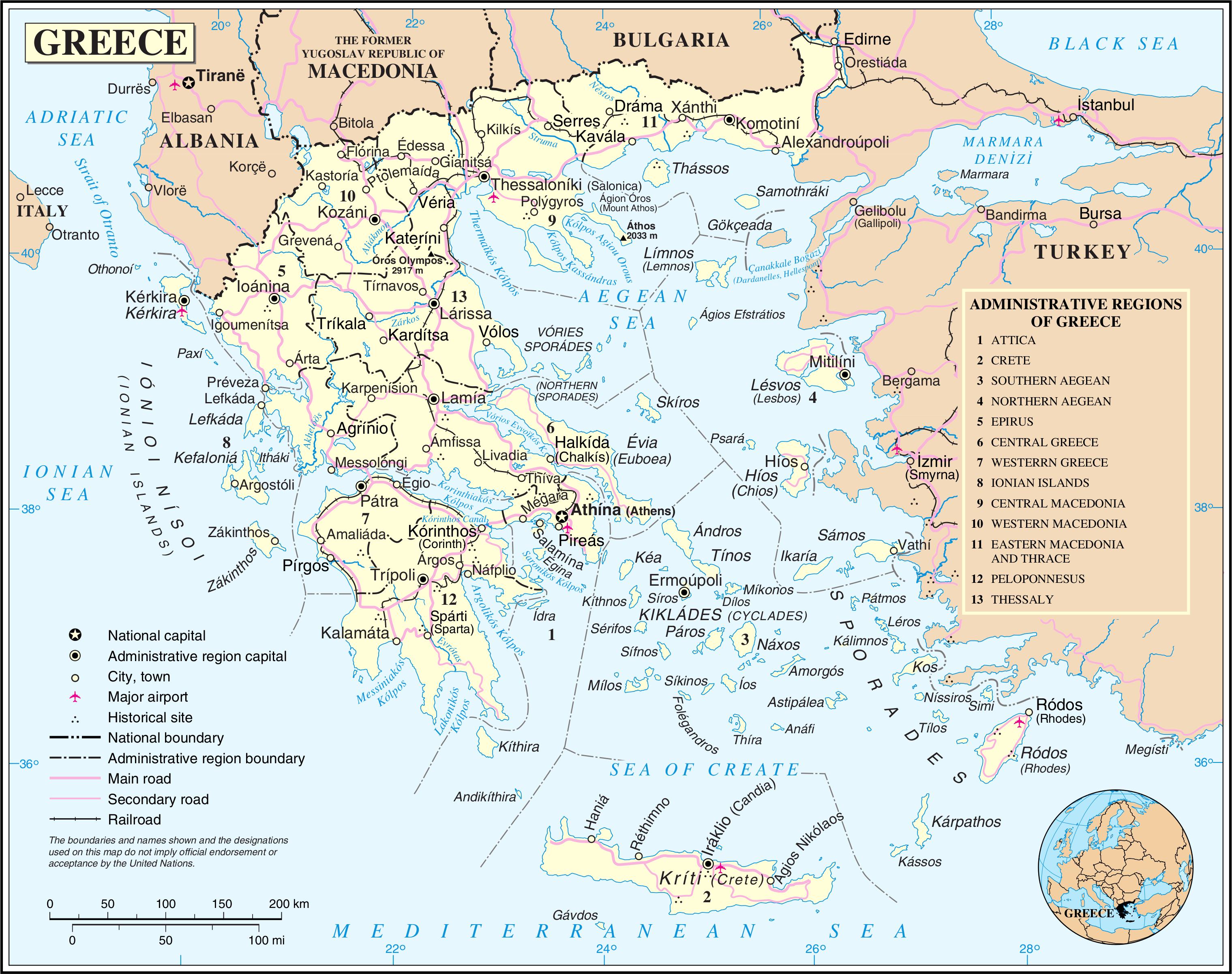
Map of Greece, showing some of the cities and regions which host archaeological ephorates.

As of 2022, the regional ephorates of the Greek Archaeological Service are as follows:

- Ephorate of Antiquities of Achaia
- Ephorate of Antiquities of Aetolia-Acarnania and Lefkada
- Ephorate of Antiquities of Argolis
- Ephorate of Antiquities of Arcadia
- Ephorate of Antiquities of Arta
- Ephorate of Antiquities of Athens
- Ephorate of Antiquities of Boeotia
- Ephorate of Antiquities of Cephalonia
- Ephorate of Antiquities of Chalkidiki and Mount Athos
- Ephorate of Antiquities of Chania
- Ephorate of Antiquities of Chios
- Ephorate of Antiquities of Kilkis
- Ephorate of Antiquities of Corfu
- Ephorate of Antiquities of Corinth
- Ephorate of Antiquities of the Cyclades
- Ephorate of Antiquities of the Dodecanese
- Ephorate of Antiquities of Drama
- Ephorate of Antiquities of Eastern Attica
- Ephorate of Antiquities of Euboea
- Ephorate of Antiquities of Evros
- Ephorate of Antiquities of Florina
- Ephorate of Antiquities of Grevena
- Ephorate of Antiquities of Imathia
- Ephorate of Antiquities of Heraklion
- Ephorate of Antiquities of Ilion
- Ephorate of Antiquities of Ioannina
- Ephorate of Antiquities of Karditsa
- Ephorate of Antiquities of Kastoria
- Ephorate of Antiquities of Kavala-Thasos
- Ephorate of Antiquities of Kozani
- Ephorate of Antiquities of Laconia
- Ephorate of Antiquities of Larissa
- Ephorate of Antiquities of Lasithi
- Ephorate of Antiquities of Lesbos
- Ephorate of Antiquities of Magnesia
- Ephorate of Antiquities of Messenia
- Ephorate of Antiquities of Pella
- Ephorate of Antiquities of Phocis
- Ephorate of Antiquities of Phthiotis and Evrytania
- Ephorate of Antiquities of Pieria
- Ephorate of Antiquities of Preveza
- Ephorate of Antiquities of Rethymno
- Ephorate of Antiquities of Rhodope
- Ephorate of Antiquities of Samos-Icaria
- Ephorate of Antiquities of Serres
- Ephorate of Antiquities of Thesprotia
- Ephorate of Antiquities of Thessaloniki City
- Ephorate of Antiquities of Thessaloniki Region
- Ephorate of Antiquities of Trikala
- Ephorate of Antiquities of Western Attica, Piraeus and the Islands.
- Ephorate of Antiquities of Xanthi
- Ephorate of Antiquities of Zakynthos

== Bibliography ==
- "ΒΙΟΓΡΑΦΙΚΟ ΣΗΜΕΙΩΜΑ" (PDF). Archaeological Museum of Thessaloniki. December 2017.
- Christiansen, Jette; Nielsen, Anne Marie (2000). The Rediscovery of Greece: Denmark and Greece in the 19th Century. Ny Carlsberg Glyptotek. ISBN 9788774522485.
- "Εφορεία Εναλίων Αρχαιοτήτων" (in Greek). Hellenic Republic – Ministry of Culture and Sports. Archived from the original on 2022-08-03.
- Fatsea, Irene (2017). "The Reception of J. J. Wincklemann During the Formative Years of the Modern Greek State (1832–1862)". In Cartledge, Paul; Voutsaki, Sofia (eds.). Ancient Monuments and Modern Identities: A Critical History of Archaeology in 19th and 20th Century Greece. London and New York: Routledge. pp. 62–76. ISBN 9781315513447.
- "General Directorate of Antiquities and Cultural Heritage" (in Greek). Hellenic Republic – Ministry of Culture and Sports.
- Initiative for Heritage Conservancy (2014). Discovering the archaeologists of Europe 2012–14: transnational report (PDF). York: York Archaeological Trust. ISBN 978-1-874454-70-0.
- Konstantinidi-Syvridi, Eleni; Paschalidis, Constantinos (2019). "The unacknowledged Panayotis Stamatakis and his invaluable contribution to the understanding of Grave Circle A at Mycenae". Archaeological Reports. 65: 111–126. doi:10.1017/S0570608419000061. JSTOR 26867451.
- Mallouchou-Toufano, Fani (2007). "The Vicissitudes of the Athenian Acropolis in the Nineteenth Century: From Castle to Monument". In Valavanis, Panos (ed.). Great Moments in Greek Archaeology. Athens: Kapon Press. pp. 36–57.
- Mantzourani, Eleni (2012). "Biography of Costis Davaras". In Betancourt, Philip; Mantzourani, Eleni (eds.). Philistor: Studies in Honor of Costis Davaras. Philadelphia: INSTAP Academic Press. pp. xxi–xxiv. ISBN 978-1-931534-65-9.
- Pantos, Pantos A. (2008). "Outline of 'Archaeology and the Archaeological Profession in Greece'".
- Pantos, Pantos A. (2014). "Archaeological Legislation during the 19th century. From Georg Ludwig von Maurer to Panagiotis Kavvadias".
- Papazarkadas, Nikolaos (2014). "Epigraphy in Early Modern Greece". Journal of the History of Collections. 26 (3): 399–412. doi:10.1093/jhc/fhu018.
- Petrakos, Vasileios (1995). Η περιπέτεια της ελληνικής αρχαιολογίας στον βίο του Χρήστου Καρούζου. Athens: Archaeological Society of Athens. ISBN 9789607036476.
- Petrakos, Vasileios (1997). Ιωάννης Κ. Παπαδημητρίου [John K. Papadimitriou]. Έπαινος Ιωάννου Κ. Παπαδημητρίου [Praise of John K. Papadimitriou] (PDF). Library of the Archaeological Society of Athens (in Greek). Vol. 168. Archaeological Society of Athens. pp. 9–51. ISBN 960-7036-70-0.
- Petrakos, Vasileios (2007). "The Stages of Greek Archaeology". In Valavanis, Panos (ed.). Great Moments in Greek Archaeology. Athens: Kapon Press. pp. 16–35. ISBN 978-0-89236-910-2.
- Petrakos, Vasileios (2011). Η εν Αθήναις Αρχαιολογική Εταιρεία. Οι Αρχαιολόγοι και οι Ανασκαφές 1837–2011 (Κατάλογος Εκθέσεως). Athens.
- Vasilikou, Dora (2011). Το χρονικό της ανασκαφής των Μυκηνών, 1870–1878 (PDF). Athens.
- Voutsaki, Sofia (2017). "Introduction". In Cartledge, Paul; Voutsaki, Sofia (eds.). Ancient Monuments and Modern Identities: A Critical History of Archaeology in 19th and 20th Century Greece. London and New York: Routledge. pp. 1–23. ISBN 9781315513447.
- Walters (1910). "Archaeological Notes". The Classical Review. 24 (8): 262–263. doi:10.1017/S0009840X0004587X. JSTOR 695040. S2CID 246878421.
