= Helle Lambridis =

Greek philosopher (1896–1970)

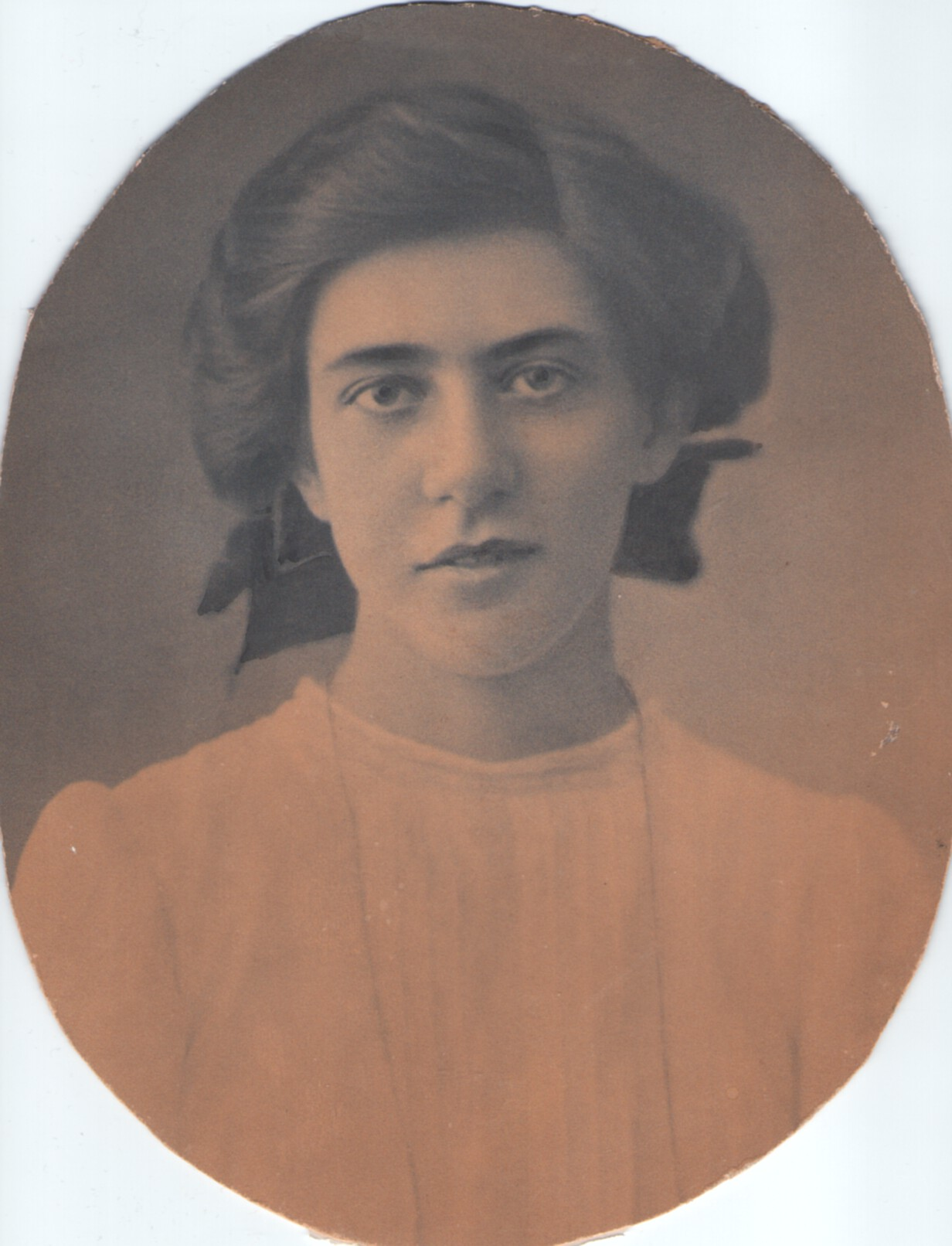
- Born: 9 January 1896; Athens, Greece
- Died: 28 January 1970 (aged 74); Athens, Greece
- Resting place: First Cemetery of Athens
- Occupations: Teacher, philosopher, writer, translator
- Spouse: Constantinos L. Stylianopoulos
- Partner: Ioannis Miliadis
- Children: Nike Stylianopoulos

Philosophical work
- Era: 20th-century philosophy
- Region: Western philosophy
- Language: Greek
- Website: http://www.academyofathens.gr/en/foundations/lampridi-library

Helle Lambridis (Greek: Έλλη Λαμπρίδη; 22 January 1896 – 28 January 1970), also spelled Helle Lampride or Elli Lambridi, was a Greek philosopher who wrote extensively in the fields of ancient and modern philosophy. She also wrote on archaeology, wrote fiction and produced translations. She was also an educator and was active in Greek left-wing politics and feminism from an early age. It has been claimed that her prominence in twentieth-century Greek philosophy has "only recently become widely known". Her life and work were celebrated on 8 March 2017 at a talks event in the old Senate chamber of the Parliament of Greece in Athens.

== Early life ==
Helle Lambridis was born in Athens on 22 January 1896. Her father, Ioannis Lambridis, from Doliana, Epirus, was a lawyer and senator in the first Venizelos administration, and known for his work concerning the liberation of Epirus. Her mother Sofia was Athenian, her family from Mytilene. Lambridis graduated from a boy's grammar school in Athens, then studied Classics at the University of Athens (1911-1916).

Helle Lambridis (upper left) with family, Doliana

She was awarded a postgraduate scholarship to study in Zurich in 1917, which she completed in philosophy and pedagogy. She received her PhD in 1919 with a thesis on Aristotle’s principles of knowledge. During this time in Zurich, she met Nikos Kazantzakis, with whom she went on a number of journeys through Switzerland between January and September 1918, beginning with a "pilgrimage" to the Upper Engadine in the footsteps of Nietzsche. Kazantzakis later nicknamed her "Mudita", meaning "joy at the pleasure of others". Their relationship continued on and off until 1957.

== Writing and political activities ==
After completing her PhD in 1919, she travelled from Zurich to London where she attended London Teacher's College in 1919. In 1920, she moved to Constantinople, commencing work at the American College for Girls, as well as teaching at Zappeion Teachers College and the Stavrodromiou Central School for Girls. She married Kostas Stylianopoulos in London in 1922. In the wake of the Asia Minor Catastrophe, they moved to Athens in 1923. Lambridis was appointed headmistress at the American College for Girls in Athens, where she organised the programme for the Greek department. Her daughter, Nike, was born in 1923; however, the couple were divorced soon afterwards.

Lambridis continued teaching and became engaged in philosophical and political issues. In 1926, she travelled to Paris as an envoy of the Greek newspaper Free Press to participate in the 10th Congress of the International Alliance for Women's Suffrage. In 1928, she resigned from the College in Athens and over the following two years dedicated herself to philosophical research and writing. Among other projects, she undertook a philosophical series for Ellinika Philla, wrote numerous essays on philosophy and psychology for the periodical Anagennisi and philosophical entries for an encyclopaedia. In 1929, she published Bergson and his Philosophy, and The Aegean: Cretan-Mycenean Political Structure. In 1930, she travelled to Prague to attend the Congress of the International Federation of University Women.

Lambridis returned to teaching in 1930, having been appointed Deputy Director of Teaching at Marasleio Teachers College. In 1931, she travelled to America to attend the Congress of the International Federation of University Women. In 1932, she was Deputy Director, first at Tripoli and then at Lamia Teachers Colleges. Her formal pedagogical career ended when she was forced to leave her position in July 1935, for political reasons, following the failed attempt by Venizelos to regain power.

Lambridis worked as a private teacher in Athens, but devoted her time to studying and writing philosophy. She attended soirees in Kydhathineon Street, Plaka, Athens (the home of Konstantinos Tsatsos, later President of Greece), and in 1937-1939 presented a series of lectures in philosophy at the cultural association, Askraios. These were very successful, attracting large audiences, and from these courses eventually came her Introduction to Philosophy (1965, 2004). In 1939, she published an extended critical review of the Odyssey by Kazantzakis in Neohellenica Grammata (Modern Greek Literature) which drew a hostile response. She also published many other articles in various literary and philosophical publications.

== War years ==
Lambridis received a scholarship from the British Council to study the English education system at London's Institute of Education and arrived in London in September, 1939. As well as her studies, she also attended lectures by Wittgenstein at Cambridge. The occupation of Europe during the war stopped her returning to Greece, and she offered her services to the Greek Government in exile in London, and in 1941 was appointed Director of the Ministry of Information, undertaking various activities, including BBC interviews, producing newsletters and teaching Greek to English SAS officers to be engaged in the Greek resistance movement. Lambridis returned to Greece in early 1945, only to be informed that her daughter, who had spent the war with family and friends, had been hit by shrapnel from a British mortar a few days earlier. The ambulance carrying Niki to hospital had then been bombed. She died on 3 Jan 1945, aged 22, an innocent victim of the Dekemvriana. Lambridis later published an account of her daughter's life told in parallel to contemporary Greek history titled Nike (Victory).

Lambridis remained in Greece for about a year before returning to the UK. While in London, she became a member of the League for Democracy in Greece and sat on the Board with ten British Labour MPs. As a result of her association with the League, her passport was confiscated by the Greek Government in 1947 and she remained in London for another ten years. During this time she continued to write, working on Nike, other fictional works, various philosophical projects and translations.

== Return to Greece ==
After regaining her passport, she was able to return to Greece in 1960, where she published Nike and continued work on a number of philosophical and literary projects.

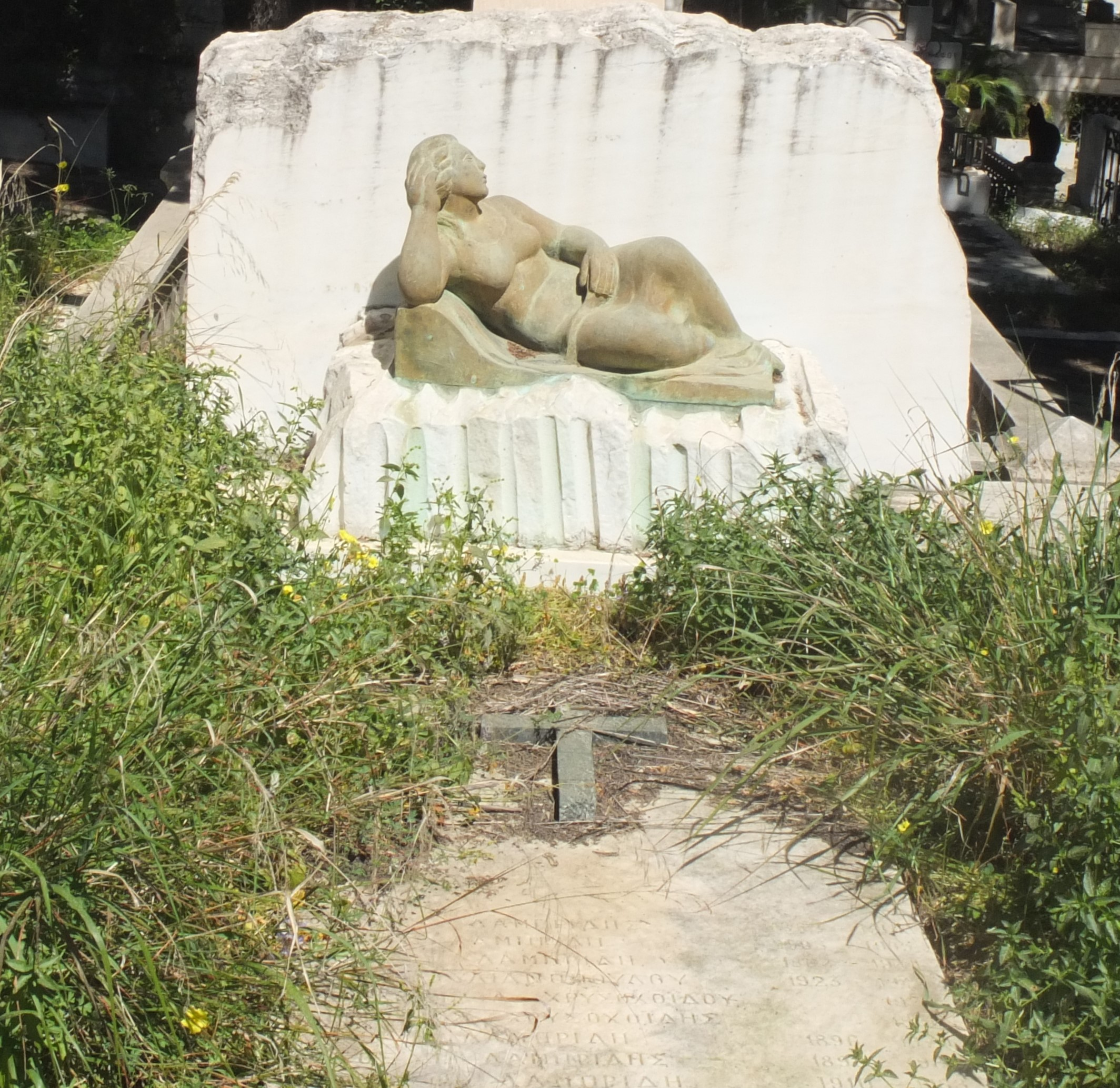
Helle's grave in Athens

She also became a member of the Socialist Democratic Union (SDE) and, in the 1964 election, was nominated as a candidate by the Socialist Party/Greek Popular Movement for Independence. In 1964, she became a member of the Société Européenne de Culture and in 1965 she travelled to Russia to participate in the Conference of the International Federation of Democratic Women. In 1967, the military dictatorship (21 April 1967 to 23 July 1974) cancelled her passport and banned the publication of the second volume of Introduction to Philosophy. In her later years, she produced a manuscript on Empedocles in English (published posthumously in the US) and was contracted to produce another work on Protagoras. She died in Athens on 28 January 1970, aged 74. She was buried in the First Cemetery.

== The Elli Lambridi Library ==
At Lambridis's request, the Elli Lambridi Philosophical Library was established after her death by the Academy of Athens and her brothers in Ypsilantou Street, Kolonaki, Athens on the basis of a small legacy and with the help of her executors. In her will, she explained that "philosophy and philosophical education was completely neglected in Greece, and although she had studied philosophy constantly, she had not completed her mission, which was to make philosophy the ultimate purpose of her life". The library is administered by the Academy of Athens and contains Lambridis's personal collection, which ranges from logic and analytic philosophy to the history of religion and a general range of philosophy texts in Greek, German, French and English. The library also holds many other philosophical works. Among Lambridis's manuscripts is a comprehensive history of ancient Greek philosophy and many works on modern analytic philosophy, as well as papers on Husserl, Heidegger, Sartre and others and the unfinished Fantasia Philosophica which was published in Greek in 2022. She also prepared a work on traditional and modern logic that she regarded as her written philosophical legacy, which is still unpublished.

== Literary legacy ==
Lambridis published over 100 works on many topics. A comprehensive bibliography has been produced by the Elli Lambridi Library. Helle Lambridis's archive is held at ELIA, (ΕΛΙΑ, ΕΛΛΗΝΙΚΟ ΛΟΓΟΤΕΧΝΙΚΟ ΙΣΤΟΡΙΚΟ ΑΡΧΕΙΟ), with an analytical index compiled by Yolanda Hatzi.

=== Philosophy and other academic works ===
- Helle Lambridis, Die Erkenntnisprinzipien bei Aristoteles (Leipzig: Buchhandlung Paul John / University of Zurich, 1919)
- Numerous essays on philosophy and psychology for the journal Anagennisi (edited by Glynou)
- Philosophical entries for an encyclopaedia (Pirsou and Eleftheroudakis)
- Nine essays for a philosophical series ‘Studies’ (Ellinika Philla)
- Bergson and his Philosophy (Athens: Georgios H. Kalergis, 1929)
- The Aegeans: The Cretan-Mycenaean Civilisation (Athens: Korais, 1929)
- Essays on philosophical and literary criticism in Nea Estia and other journals including Horizontes, Neoellinika Grammata, Epoches and Kanouria Epochi
- Critical review of Kazantzakis’ Odyssey, spanning seven editions of Neoellinika Grammata (Νεοελληνικὰ Γράμματα), 1939
- Commentary on Sikelianos’ poem ‘Mother of God’, Nea Politiki, 1939
- Essays Critical and Philosophical, 1952
- Helle Lambridis, 'Erdachtes Gesprach mit Wittgenstein', in Szczesny, Gerhard (ed.), Club Voltaire: Jahrbuch für kritische Aufklärung 1 (Munich: Szczesny Verlag, 1963), pp. 257–270
- Introduction to Philosophy, vol. 1 (1965)
- Empedocles. A Philosophical Investigation, with a foreword by Marshal McLuhan, (University of Alabama, 1976)
- Introduction to Philosophy, vol. 1, 2 (Athens: Academy of Athens, 2004) (In Greek)
- An Imaginary Dialogue with Wittgenstein (Athens: Academy of Athens, 2004) (In Greek)
- Greek Poetry of the Last 50 Years (1937)
- 'Greece in our Time'
- Helle Lambridis, Fantasia Philosophica, edited by Konstantinos Garitsis, with a Preface by Linos Benakis (Athens: KEEF, 2022)

=== Literature ===
- Helle Lambridis, Nike (In Greek). Edited and with introduction by Yolanda Hatzi (Athens: Difros, 1960)
- Helle Lambridis, Smoke (Short story in Greek). Edited and with introduction by Yolanda Hatzi (Athens: Kastaniotis, 2019). ISBN 978-960-03-6612-9
- Helle Lambridis, The New People: Variations on A Theme [1964] (Novel in English). Editorial note by Yolanda Hatzi; preface by Peter Durno Murray (Anemi Digital Library/ University of Crete, 2023).

=== Translations ===
Various complete works including those by Bergson, Schiller, Laforgue and Esterlich

- Wilhelm Strohmayer, Vorlesungen uber die Psychopathologie des Kindesalters (Lectures on the Psychopathology of Adolescence), 1933
- Paul Valéry, Eupalinos, or The Architect, with a foreword by Angelos Sikeliano (Agra, 1935, 1988, 1993)
- Various short translations in Ellinika Philla
- Plato, Meno (into English), with a comprehensive introductory essay (Dimitrakou, 1939)
- Thucidides Historia with an introduction and commentary (4 volumes, Govostis, 1962–66)
- Various works by contemporary Greek authors including Kazantzakis, 'Askitiki' (1931), amongst others
