= Andreas Moustoxydis =

Greek historian and philologist

- Ανδρέας Μουστοξύδης
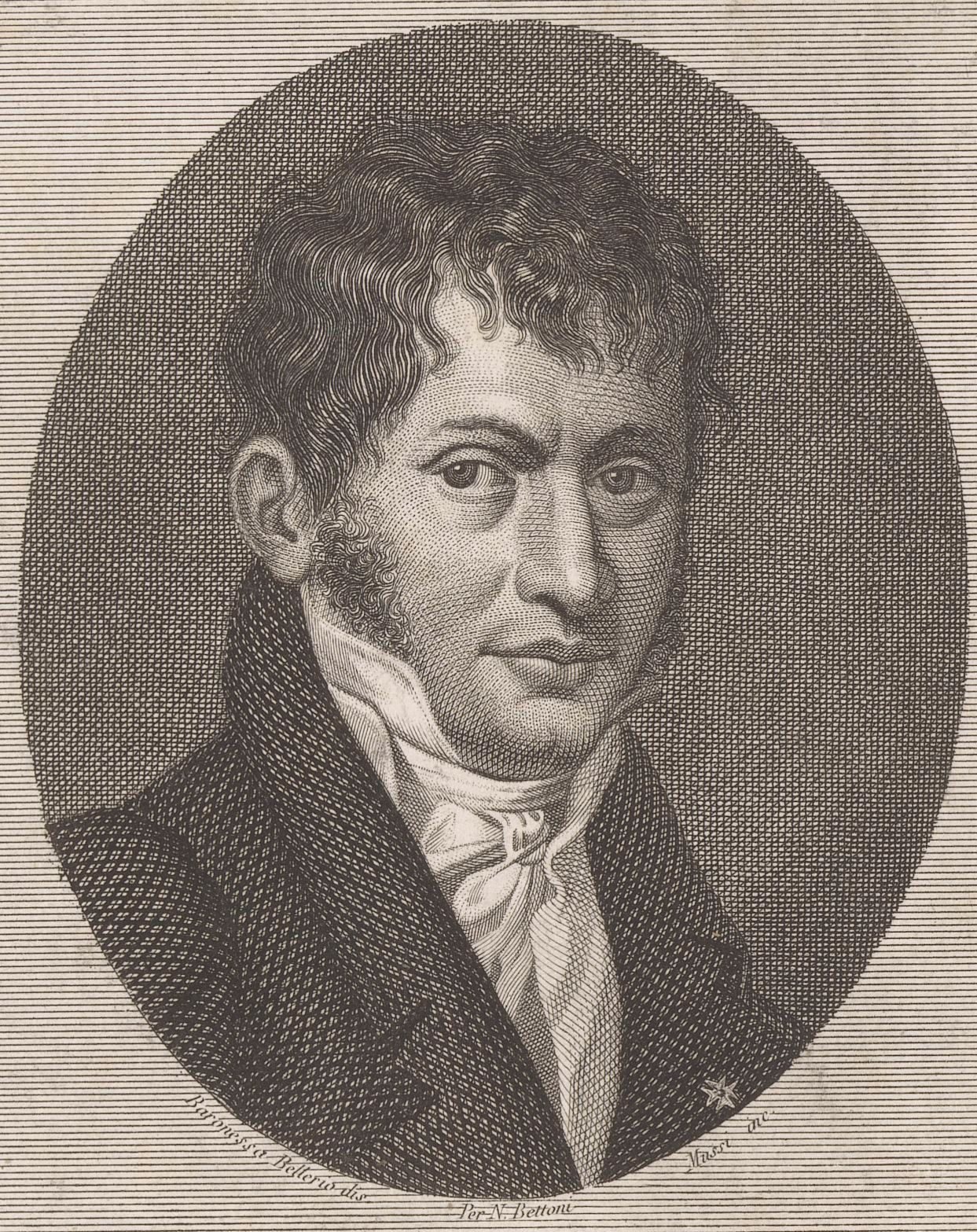
- Posthumous portrait (1875–1909) printed in Italy
- Born: 6 October 1785; Corfu
- Died: 29 July 1860 (aged 75)
- Occupations: Philologist; Historian
- Known for: First director of the Greek national archaeological museum

Andreas Moustoxydis (Greek: Ανδρέας Μουστοξύδης, 6 January 1785 – 29 July 1860), sometimes Latinized as Mustoxydes or in the Italian form Andrea Mustoxidi, was a Greek historian and philologist from Corfu.

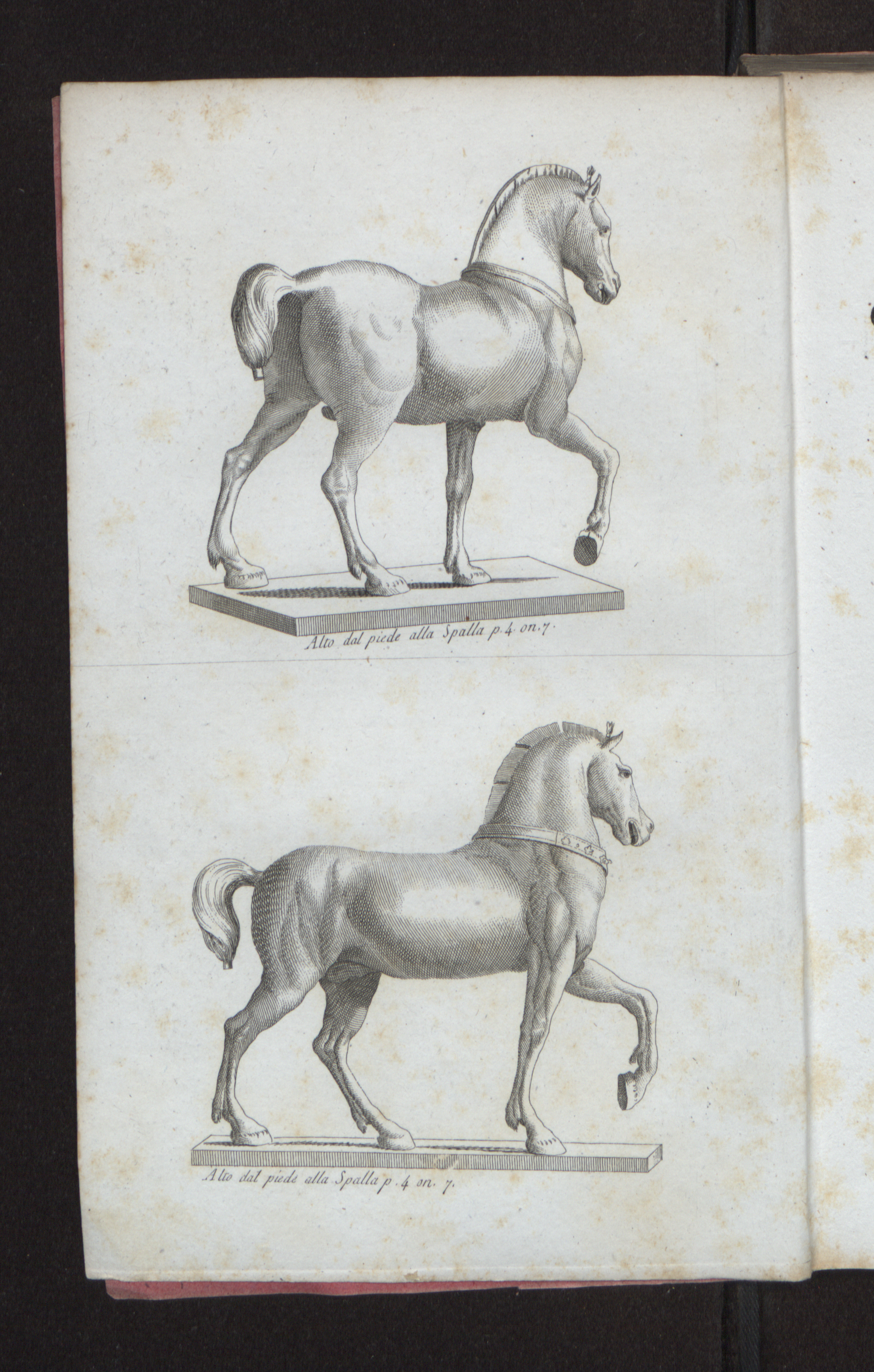
Sui quattro cavalli della Basilica di S. Marco in Venezia, 1816

== Biography ==
Moustoxydis studied at Pavia, and in 1804 published a treatise on the history of Corfu titled Notizie per servire alla storia Corcirese dai tempi eroici al secolo XII. This publication led to employment as historiographer of the Ionian Islands, a position he maintained until 1819.

As a young man, he undertook an extended scientific journey to Italy, followed by travels to France and Germany. In Italy, he discovered manuscripts of the rhetorician Isocrates at the Ambrosian and Laurentian libraries. In the meantime, he published a two-volume work on the history of Corfu called Illustrazioni Corciresi (1811–14).

In 1820, he was appointed secretary to the Russian envoy at Turin, and nine years later was named director of education by Greek president Ioannis Kapodistrias. He was further named, in October 1829, as 'director and ephor' of the first Greek national archaeological museum, then on the island of Aegina.

Following Kapodistrias' murder in 1831, he returned to Corfu, and was restored to his former position as historiographer. Here, he founded the philological and historical journal Hellenomnemon. At the time of his death, he was director of the department of education at Ionian Academy.

As a philologist, Mustoxydis edited seven of Isocrates' orations, the scholia of Olympiodorus on Plato, and in collaboration with Demetrios Schinas of Constantinople, he published a five volume edition of Ambrosian Anecdota. In addition, he was author of an Italian translation of Herodotus (1822), and also published a number of papers on the 2nd century author Polyaenus.

He was elected as a member to the American Philosophical Society in 1843.
