= Archaeological Society of Athens =

Greek learned society

Coordinates: 37°58′43.3″N 23°44′04.8″E

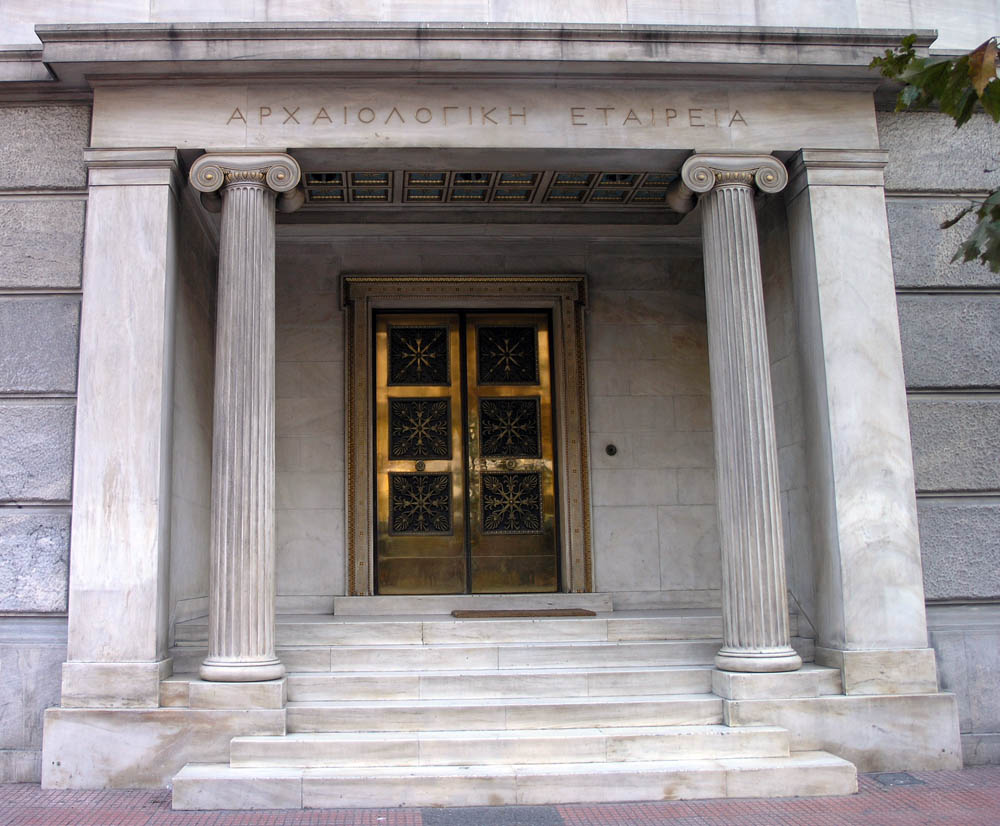
- Facade (front door) of the Archaeological Society of Athens
- Formation: January 6, 1837
- Headquarters: Panepistimiou 22, Athina 105 64, Greece
- Region served: Athens, Greece
- Fields: Archaeology
- Founder: Konstantinos Bellios
- President: Apostolos S. Georgiadis
- Vice-president: Charalampos Rousos
- Website: www.archetai.gr/index.php?p=content&id=1&lang=en

The Archaeological Society of Athens (Greek: Εν Αθήναις Αρχαιολογική Εταιρεία, romanized: En Athínais Archaiologikí Etaireía) is an independent learned society. Also termed the Greek Archaeological Society, it was founded in 1837 by Konstantinos Bellios, just a few years after the establishment of the modern Greek State, with the aim of encouraging archaeological excavations, maintenance, care and exhibition of antiquities in Greece.

The Archaeological Society of Athens work in excavation and funding of archaeological endeavours are extensive. For example, the society helped discover new epigraphical evidence associated with the sanctuary of the goddess Demeter within Eleusis. In addition to this, they provided plans of the prehistoric settlement of Thorikos to help uncover ancient ceramic material.

== History ==
The Archaeological Society of Athens is an independent archaeological organisation of scholars, historians, and academics founded in 1837. It was built to relocate, restore, and re-erecting the antiquities of Greece lost after the War of Independence.

In collaborations with Greek archaeologist Kyriakos Pittakis, founder Konstantinos Bellios establish the independent society by first informing the Minister of Education Iakovakis Rizos Neroulos, and Head of Division of the Ministry of Education Alexandros Rizos Rangavis. Wherein the founding documents of the Archaeological Society of Athens were written in 1836.

The independent society was assisted the state through the acceptance of donations in money and archaeological publications. Thus, accelerating excavations, restoration and additions to ancient monuments in order to restore neglected Greek artefacts and scholarship in places such as the Eleusis and Thorikos.

== Notable members ==
Konstantinos Bellios was an Aromanian from Linotopi, in the Kastoria Prefecture. Bellios began his career in commerce and finance. However, following the establishment of the Kingdom of Greece, as a wealthy scholar and nationalist, he donated to causes and organisations that assisted the reconstruction of Greece. His contributions to Athens are demonstrated in December 1837, when in collaboration with Kyriakos Pittakis, the director of the Greek Archaeological Service, led him to find and fund the private Archaeological Society of Athens.

From 1859 to 1894, scholar and epigraphist Stefanos Koumanoudis became the Secretary of the society. Koumanoudis initiated large-scale excavations around Athens including Kermeikos, Acropolis, and the Theatre of Dionysus. He went further than Athens to Attica, excavating sites including Thorikos, Marathon, and Eleusis. Further, the Boeotian sites of Thespiae, Tangram and Chaeronea. He also had the initiative in excavating in the Peloponnese (Mycenae, Epidaurus, Lakonia) and the Cyclades.

Other significant members include the vice president from 1975 to 1977, Semni Karouzou, who was born in Tripoli, Greece. She was a classical archaeologist that graduated from the University of Athens. Karaouzou specialised in the study of ceramic material from Greece and was responsible for curating the National Archaeological Museum of Athens, a museum founded by the society. This made her the first woman to join the Greek Archaeological Service, where she proceeded to excavate sites in Crete, Euboea, Thessaly, and others.

Other Notable Members

- Georgios Veltsos (1891–1980) – Member of the Board (1924–1954), Vice President (1954–1968) and President (1968–1980)
- Panagiotis Kavvadias (1850–1928) – Consultant (1886–1894) and secretary (1895–1909, 1912–1920), general inspector of antiquities (1885–1909), Professor of Archaeology at the University (1904–1922) and Member of the Academy (1926)
- Spyridon Phintiklis (1820–1894) – Member of the Board (1861–1862) and Vice President (1862–1894), Professor of Greek Literature since October 5, 1863.
- Christos Tsountas (1857–1934) Member of the Board, (1896–1909, 1918–1920, 1924–1926), Secretary (1909–1911), Ephor of antiquities for the Society (1882) and the Archaeological Service (1883–1904), Professor at the faculty of Philosophy at the University in Athens (1904–1924) and Thessaloniki (1927)

General Assembly

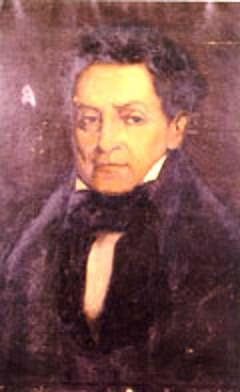
Konstantinos Bellios, Founder of the Archaeological Society of Athens

BOARD OF ADMINISTRATION
President	Apostolos S. Georgiadis
Vice-president	Charalampos Rousos
Secretary general	Vasileios Ch. Petrakos
Members	Dora Vasilikou, Nikolaos Kaltsas, Chrysa Maltezou, Dionysios Minotos, Alexis Phylactopoulos, Lefteris Platon, Vasileios Sgoutas, Michalis Tiverios

SERVICES
Library	Director: Martin Schaefer. Others: Matina Givalou, Konstantinos Papoutsis
Accountant's office	Elias Papaioannou, Christoforos Spyridakis
Archive	Ioanna Ninou
Reception	Konstantinos Sakkas, Christina Stefanidi

== The Archive of the Archaeological Society ==
The Archive of the Archaeological Society holds a significant collection of historical and archaeological records around Greece. It includes personal diaries, sketches, and documents of prominent archaeologists published by the organisation.

The visual archives of the library include photographs and drawings. The inclusion of early excavation photography and negatives preserve monuments and artefacts that changed during excavation or natural causes. The archive of drawings includes sketches of the Pagassae Stelae, watercolours representing the Acropolis sculptures by Émile Gilliéron, as well as an Archive of Anastasios Orlando's drawings Further, the Archive preserves topographic plans of archaeological sites, which include stratigraphy and grids. Thus, allowing for consideration and exploration of entire sites and smaller areas by archaeologists such as Kevin Clinton.

The written documents of the archive include excavation notebooks and documentation. The archival collection of excavation notebooks kept daily documentation of various phases of excavation, such as the trenches, exact locations, and the depth where artefacts were discovered. Moreover, the systematically organised Archive of documentation includes items such as the complete handwritten columns of the Ephorate and the Council, the Archaeological Council, the Register of Members, catalogue of museums. The archive collection also includes individual archives such as archaeologist Panagiotis Eustratiadis' documents from 1864 to 1894, which contained 37 folders regarding the Archaeological Society.

Publications in the Library of Archaeological Society of Athens

1. The series "Vivliotheke tes en Athenais Archaiologikes Hetaireias"
2. The journal Praktika tes en Athenais Archaiologikes Hetaireias
3. The journal Archaiologike Ephemeris
4. The journal To Ergon tes en Athenais Archaiologikes Hetaireias
5. The journal "O Mentor".

Donors

- Ministry of Culture
- Stavros Niarchos Foundation
- National Bank of Greece
- Alexander S. Onasis Public Benefit Foundation
- Costas and Eleni Ouranis Foundation
- Petros Haris Foundation
- Psychas Foundation
- Academy of Athens
- Paul & Alexandra Canellopoulos Foundation
- Lilian Voudouri Foundation

== Discoveries toward the Bronze Age Eleusis ==
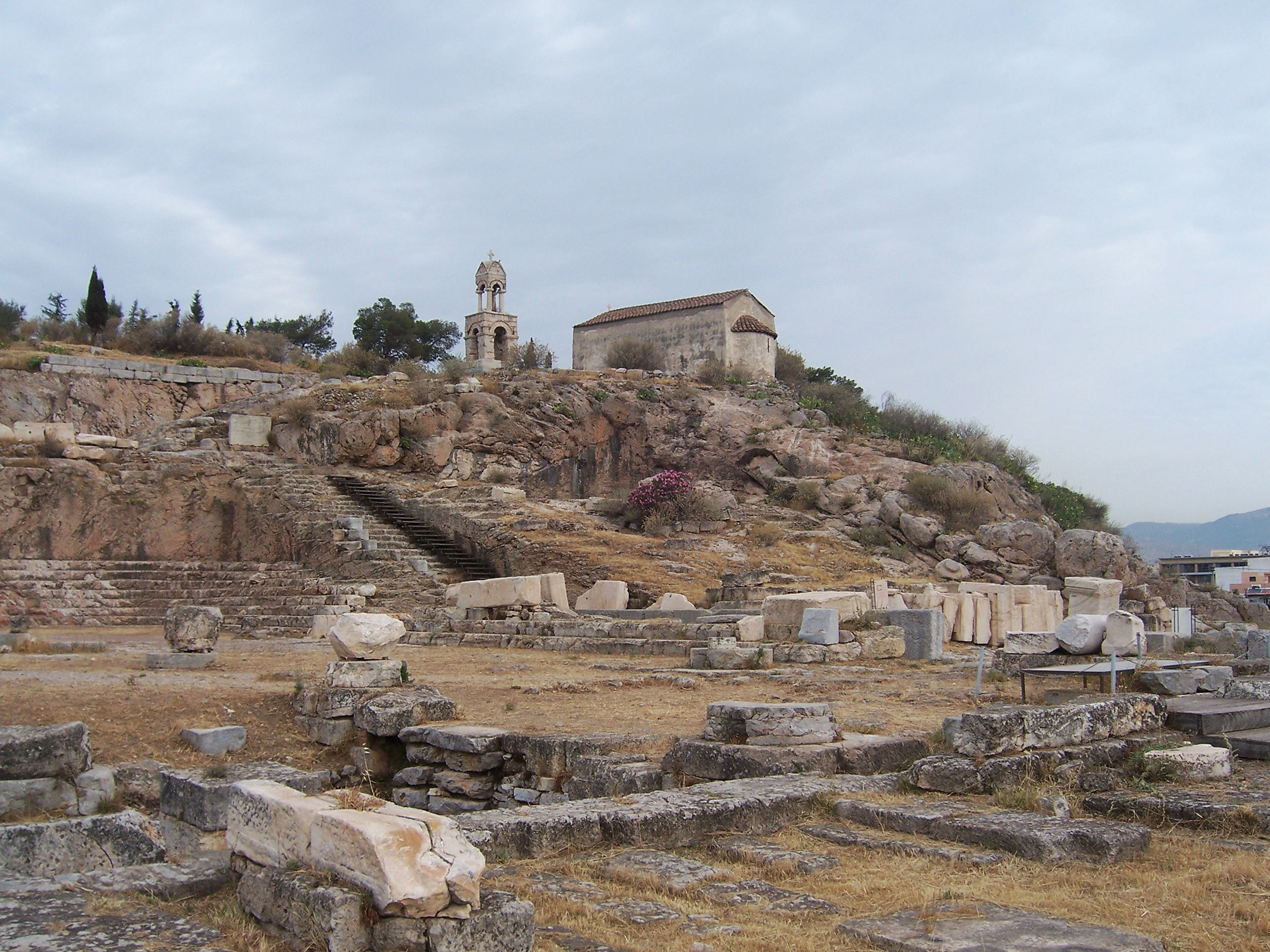
Sanctuary of Demeter and Kore and the Telesterion (Initiation Hall), center for the Eleusinian Mysteries

The society helped discover new epigraphical evidence associated with the sanctuary and cult of the goddess Demeter within Eleusis. Academics published re-editions of 686 documents in chronological order. Thus, allowing a base for future studies of Eleusis' socioeconomic history and its polytheist religion.

Historian Kevin Clinton worked in collaboration since 1966 with the Archaeological Society of Athens to transcribe and archive the stone Eleusinian Inscriptions. The site of Eleusis is home to the important sanctuary of the fertility goddesses Demeter and Persephone, as well as the site of the annual festival of Mysteries. Clinton's complement of a comprehensive collection of the inscriptions is demonstrated in Volume 1a, which contained 686 inscriptions, as well as Volume 1b's 307 plates with images of texts. Each text is written with a detailed description and context of where it was found.

Professor of Greek history Michael B. Cosmopoulos employed the prior systematic excavations conducted by the Archaeological Society of Athens in the late 19th century and early 20th century, in conjunction with contemporary archaeological methods to provide an assessment of the architecture, stratigraphy, and ceramics of the Bronze Age settlement in Eleusis. Cosmopoulos' close reading into the society's past works, such as those done by Kevin Clinton, stimulated new discussion on the archaeology of mystery cults and the formation stages of Greek sanctuaries.

== Excavations in Thorikos ==
The Archaeological Society of Athens provided plans for the prehistoric settlement of Thorikos, enabling historians and scholars to excavate new findings in the city. By working with archaeologists whilst in partnership with other organisations they helped uncover ancient ceramic material.

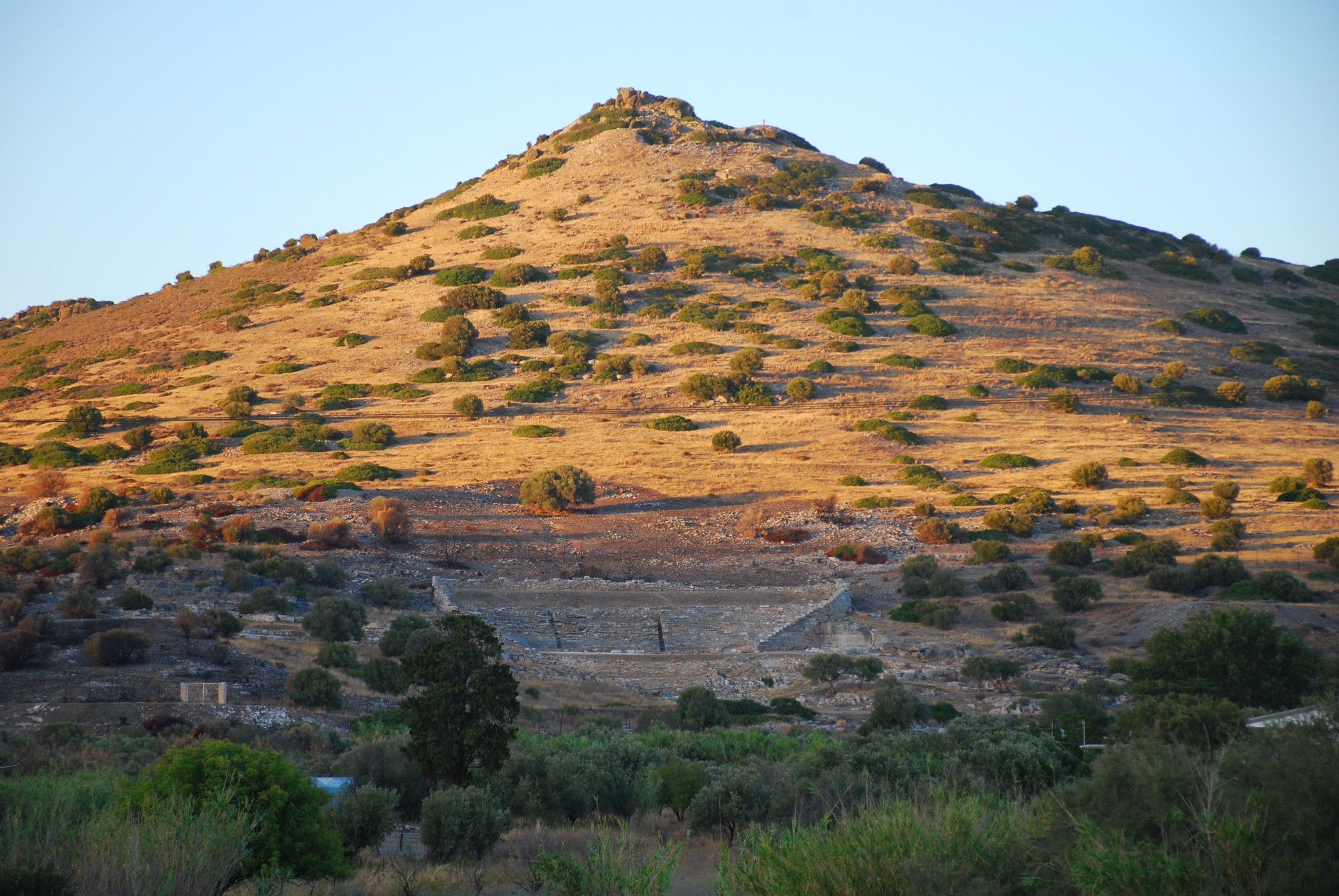
Thorikos

Archaeologist of Mediterranean history Nikolas Papadimitriou used past excavation documentation within The Archive of the Archaeological Society to further research into the ceramic remains within Thorikos. Thorikos was a city that was attributed to the formation of Archaic Athens, inhabited from the Neolithic Age.

The prior excavation in Thorikos was by the director of the National Archaeological society in 1887, and a member of the Archaeological Society of Athens, Valerios Stais. Aided by the funding of the Archaeologist Society of Athens in 1893, Greek archaeologist Stais explored the tholos tombs III, as well as the habitation site that he noted to be on Velatouri Hill. Stais' excavation led to the creation of two reports on the artefacts such as pottery in the tombs, and the two phases of occupation in Thorikos pre-Mycenaean and Mycenaean in the inhabited site.

Derived from this, Nikolas Papadimitriou's exploration of Stais' prehistoric pottery assessed the periods of occupation in Thorikos to theorise on Thorikos' connections in trade as well as their prehistoric culture. By documenting the chronological distributions and material, he proved the increasing Aegean connections and integration into trade that Thorikos experienced during the Mycenaean occupation. Thus, through the prior excavation and documentation of Thorikos by society member Valeios Stais, future exploration of Thorikos was allowed.

== Gallery ==
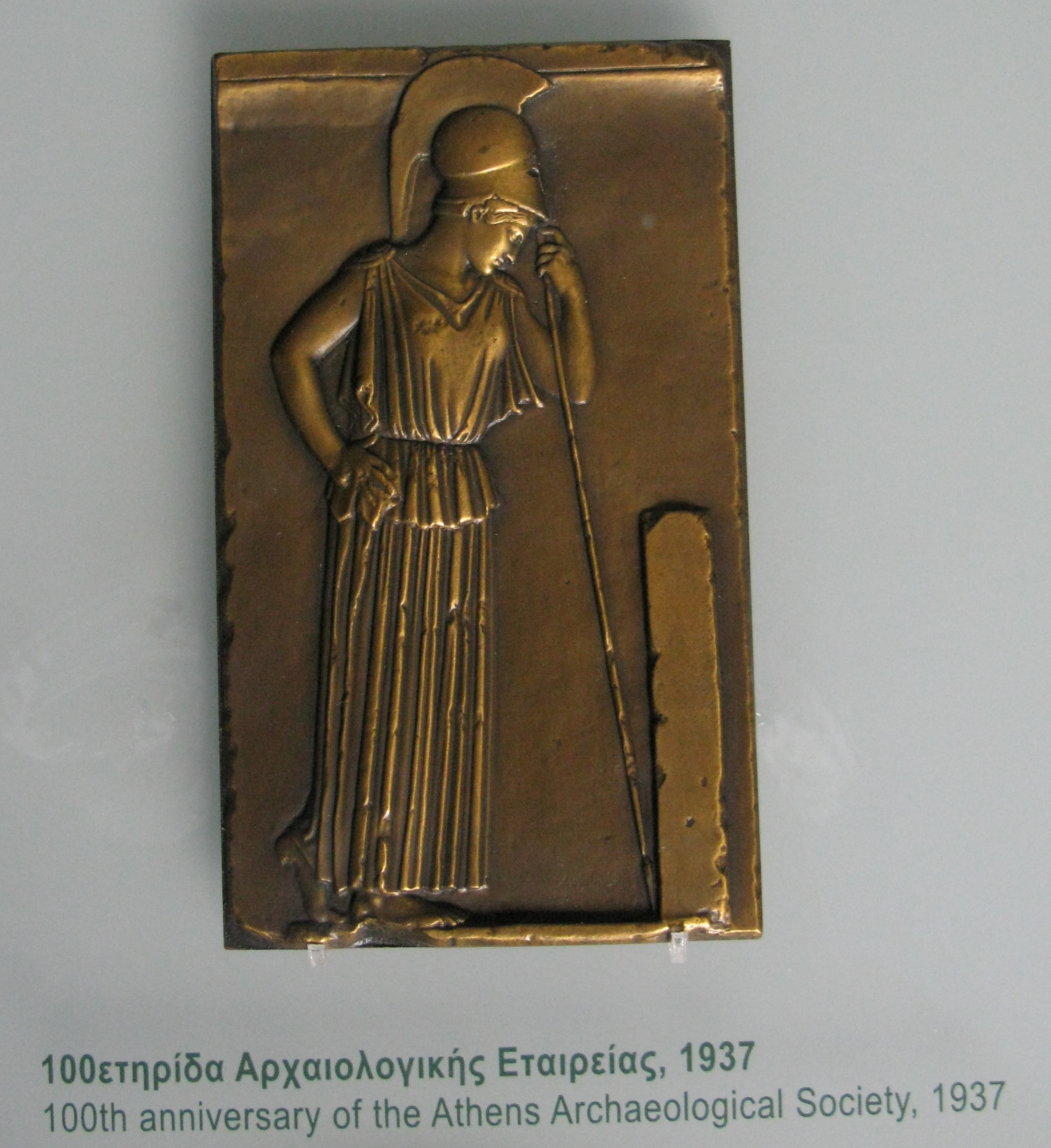
100th anniversary of the Athens Archaeological Society, 1937

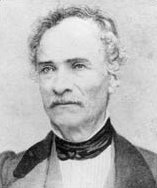
Kyriakos Pittakis, Greek archaeologist that worked in collaboration with Konstantinos Bellios

== See also ==
- National Archaeological Museum of Athens
- Greek Archaeological Service
