= Valerios Stais =

Greek archaeologist (1857-1923)

Valerios Stais (Greek: Βαλέριος Στάης; Kythira, 1857 – Athens, 1923) was a Greek archaeologist.

== Biography ==
Stais initially studied medicine but later switched to archaeology, obtaining his Doctorate from the University of Halle (Saale) in 1885. He worked for the National Archaeological Museum of Athens beginning in 1887. During his tenure, he became Director of the Museum, a post he held until his death. During that period he organized or participated in excavations in Epidaurus, Argolis, Attica, Dimini, Antikythera and elsewhere. He wrote a lot on archaeological matters, published several papers, mainly in Archeologiki Efimeris (Αρχαιολογική Εφημερίς, 'Archaeological Newspaper'), and many books.

Valerios Stais also became the first to study the Antikythera mechanism from the lumps of archaeological material retrieved from a wreck found near the coast of Antikythera in 1900. He identified that one of the pieces had a gear wheel embedded in it.
