= Semni Karouzou =

Greek archaeologist and art historian

- Σέμνη Καρούζου
- Born: Polysemni Papaspyridi; 1897; Tripoli, Greece
- Died: 8 December 1994 (aged 96–97)
- Occupations: Archaeologist and curator
- Spouse: Christos Karouzos (m. 1930; died 1967)

Academic work
- Discipline: Greek Archaeology
- Sub-discipline: Ceramics
- Institutions: National Archaeological Museum, Athens; Greek Archaeological Service

Semni Papaspyridi-Karouzou (Greek: Σέμνη Παπασπυρίδη-Καρούζου; 1897 – 8 December 1994) was a Greek classical archaeologist who specialized in the study of pottery from ancient Greece. She was the first woman to join the Greek Archaeological Service; she excavated in Crete, Euboea, Thessaly, and the Argolid, and worked as curator of ceramic collections at the National Archaeological Museum in Athens for over thirty years. She experienced political persecution under the Greek military junta of 1967–1974. She has been described by the archaeologists Marianna Nikolaidou and Dimitra Kokkinidou as "perhaps the most important woman in Greek archaeology", and by the newspaper To Vima as "the last representative of the generation of great archaeologists".

== Early and personal life ==
Polysemni Papaspyridi, who went by Semni, was born in 1897 in Tripoli, Greece. (Note: 1897 is given as her birth date by Nikolaidou & Kokkinidou 1998; other sources give it as 1898 or 1889) Her father was a military officer, and her mother the French-educated daughter of a judge; her family moved frequently due to her father's career, finally settling in Athens. She took the name Papaspyridi-Karouzou on her marriage in 1930 to Christos Karouzos, also an archaeologist.

== Education and early archaeological career ==
Karouzou studied archaeology at the University of Athens, where she was taught by the archaeologist Christos Tsountas. She joined the Greek Archaeological Service in 1921 as a curator of antiquities at the National Archaeological Museum of Athens, becoming the first woman to do so. Karouzou then worked on excavations at Bronze Age sites at Herakleion, on Crete, and the classical site of Eretria, on Euboea. In 1928, she (along with Christos Karouzos) was awarded a Humboldt Fellowship to study at the Ludwig-Maximilians-Universität München and the Friedrich Wilhelm University of Berlin; when she returned to Greece in 1930 she was promoted to the post of Ephor of Antiquities (head of an ephorate, an archaeological administrative district), an achievement described as a "feminist victory" by the activist Avra Theodoropoulou. Karouzou held the post in Thessaly and then in the Argolid, where she excavated tombs from the Mycenaean and classical periods; worked in ancient Epidaurus; and worked to preserve historic buildings in the town of Nafplio, where she later published a guide.

== Curatorial work ==
In 1933, Karouzou became curator of the ceramic collections at the National Archaeological Museum in Athens, a post she held for over thirty years (until 1964). For most of this period women were prohibited from joining the Archaeological Service under a law introduced by the dictator Ioannis Metaxas in 1936, and existing women members were refused promotion to the highest posts as museum directors or ephors. Karouzou's work included reorganising the collections - identifying artefacts which had not been properly catalogued, recording them, and arranging new displays—work which she described as 'invisible service'. She also wrote extensively on the museum's collections of ceramics and stone monuments, as well as on new archaeological discoveries. Her monograph on the Amasis Painter, a major painter of Attic black-figure pottery, was described by a reviewer as "a scholarly and valuable study". Karouzou's earliest studies on the painter go back to 1931, and she was invited to write her monograph on the painter in 1938. This monograph was published after the war in 1956.

On the outbreak of the Greek–Italian war in 1940, Karouzou and her husband (along with other archaeologists, museum guards, and their families) packed away the museum's collections for safety during World War II. Karouzou later recalled that "It was with pride for our people that I was assured, in the end of the war when the boxes were opened and the antiquities received, despite [the] fatally insufficient supervision [of the packing process] not a single gold object, no precious gem was missing". When Athens was occupied by the German army in 1941, the Karouzous were the only archaeologists in Greece to withdraw their membership of the German Archaeological Institute in protest. After the end of World War II, they were responsible for reinstalling the museum collections, using the catalogues Karouzou had made; this reinstallation was completed in 1947.

== Career post-retirement ==
In 1964, Karouzou turned 67 and was forced to retire from the Archaeological Service due to a new law imposing an age limit on civil servants. Three years later, the Greek military junta came to power, a month after Karouzou's husband died of a heart attack. As a political liberal, Karouzou was labelled a dissident and banned from accessing material in the museum by the junta-appointed General Director of Antiquities, Spyridon Marinatos. Unable to carry out her research on the museum's collections—a situation which she described as "a shameless exclusion from the places of research of unpublished ancient works"—she secretly left the country by boat to stay at the German Institute in Rome and then in Munich by invitation from colleagues. On her return, she was accused of being a communist and prohibited from leaving the country again. An international outcry arose over this prohibition; a letter written by a group of British archaeologists (including Bernard Ashmole and John Boardman) was published on the front page of The Times. This led to Karouzou being allowed to leave the country to spend time visiting exiled Greeks in Rome and Lyon and to work as an invited scholar at the University of Tübingen and the University of Geneva.

Following the fall of the junta in 1974, Karouzou was able to return to Greece and become chair of the Greek arm of the Lexicon Iconographicarum Mythologicae Classicae ('Lexicon of the Iconographies of Classical Mythology'). From 1975 to 1977, she was vice president of the Archaeological Society at Athens, and she was made president of the International Congress of Classical Archaeology in 1983. She was awarded honorary doctorates from the University of Lyon, the University of Tübingen, and Aristotle University of Thessaloniki for her scholarship and contributions to the field. In total, Karouzou published twenty books and over one hundred and twenty articles during the course of her career; she also contributed to public access to archaeology through the publication of guidebooks to the National Archaeological Museum and to archaeological sites.

Archaeologists Nikolaidou and Kokkinidou (specialists in the history of Greek archaeology) describe Karouzou as "perhaps the most important woman in Greek archaeology", and refer to her "continuous scholarly effort, broad intellectual perspective, social contribution and democratic sensitivity" and the innovative nature of her approach to ancient artefacts, particularly iconography on pottery, by which she "moved beyond the images to real people, their everyday life, attitudes and ideologies". Karouzou defined her own research methodology as attempting to reveal "the invisible meaning of ancient works".

Karouzou died in December 1994. In its announcement of her death, the Greek newspaper To Vima called her 'the last representative of the generation of great archaeologists'.

== Selected publications ==
- National Museum: Illustrated Guide to the Museum, Εκδοτική Αθηνών, 2000.
- Βιώματα και μνημόσυνα (Experiences and memorials), ΗΟΡΟΣ 2.2, 1984, pp. 1–61
- Nauplion (in Greek: Το Ναύπλιο). Εμπορική Τράπεζα της Ελλάδος, 1979.
- The Amasis Painter, Oxford: Clarendon Press, 1956.
- Corpus Vasorum Antiquorum. Grèce 2: Athènes, Musée National 2, Paris, 1954 (publication of the National Museum's classical vase collections)
