= Old Acropolis Museum =

Defunct archaeological museum in Athens, Greece

Coordinates: 37.971°N 23.728°E

The Acropolis Museum
- Μουσείο Ακρόπολης
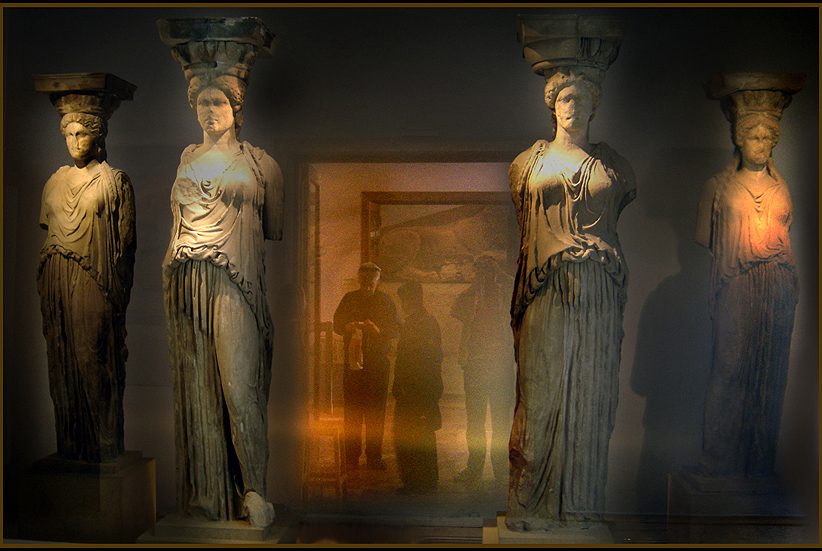
- Established: 1865
- Dissolved: 2007
- Location: Athens, Greece
- Type: Archaeological

The Old Acropolis Museum (Greek: (Παλαιό) Μουσείο Ακρόπολης (Palaio) Mouseio Akropolis) was a major archaeological museum in Athens, Greece, on the archeological site of the Acropolis. It is built in a niche at the eastern edge of the rock and most of it lies beneath the level of the hilltop, making it largely invisible. The site limited its size, so the Greek government decided in the late 1980s to build a new, larger museum, the New Acropolis Museum, at the foot of the Acropolis. The old museum closed in June 2007 so that its contents could be moved to the new one, which opened on 20 June 2009.

== History ==
The museum was home to many of the Greek world's ancient relics found in and around the Acropolis of Athens since excavations started. It was designed by architect Panagis Kalkos and was constructed between 1865 and 1874. It was expanded in the 1950s to a modern design executed by Patroklos Karantinos, a Greek modernist architect.

The Acropolis Museum housed stone sculptures and bronze remains from the monuments of the Acropolis and some artifacts that are excavated on the site. The building is located in the south-east corner of the Acropolis. In 1974 prime minister Konstantinos Karamanlis proposed the construction of a new museum. Initial plans were made under Melina Mercouri and the ground of the Makrygianni former military hospital and Gendarmerie barracks was chosen. The first competition was criticized and a new competition proclaimed some years later. In 2007 the old building was closed to prepare the move to the new building.

=== The new building ===
A new building was designed by Bernard Tschumi and Michali Fotiades, and constructed from 2002 to 2007 on Areopagitou Street. It was inaugurated on Saturday, June 20, 2009, and the entrance fee was 1 euro for the first year, and 5 euros thereafter.

=== Damage to the Acropolis ===
Drainage pipes from the Old Acropolis Museum have been attributed for causing much of the decay of the Acropolis.

== Collections ==
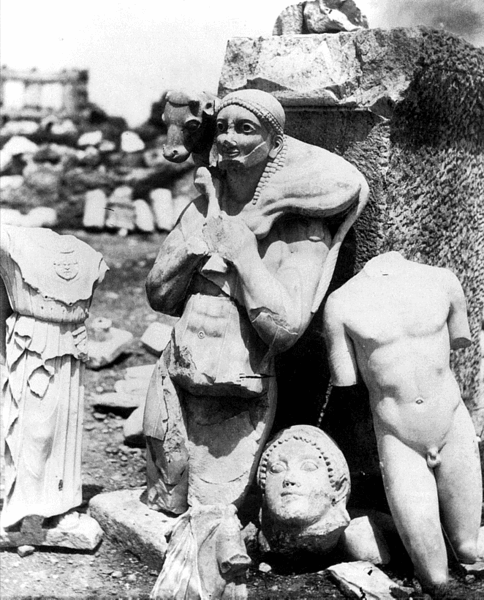
Perserschutt, Acropolis of Athens, 1866

The museum housed artifacts that were found on the site of the Acropolis of Athens. They derive mainly from the Parthenon, the Propylaea, the Erechtheum, the Temple of Athena Nike, the Eleusinion, the Sanctuary of Artemis Brauronia, the Chalkotheke, the Pandroseion, the Old Temple of Athena, the Odeon of Herodes Atticus, the sanctuary of Asclepius or Asclepieion, the Temple and Theatre of Dionysus Eleutheureus, and the Odeon of Pericles.

== Highlights ==
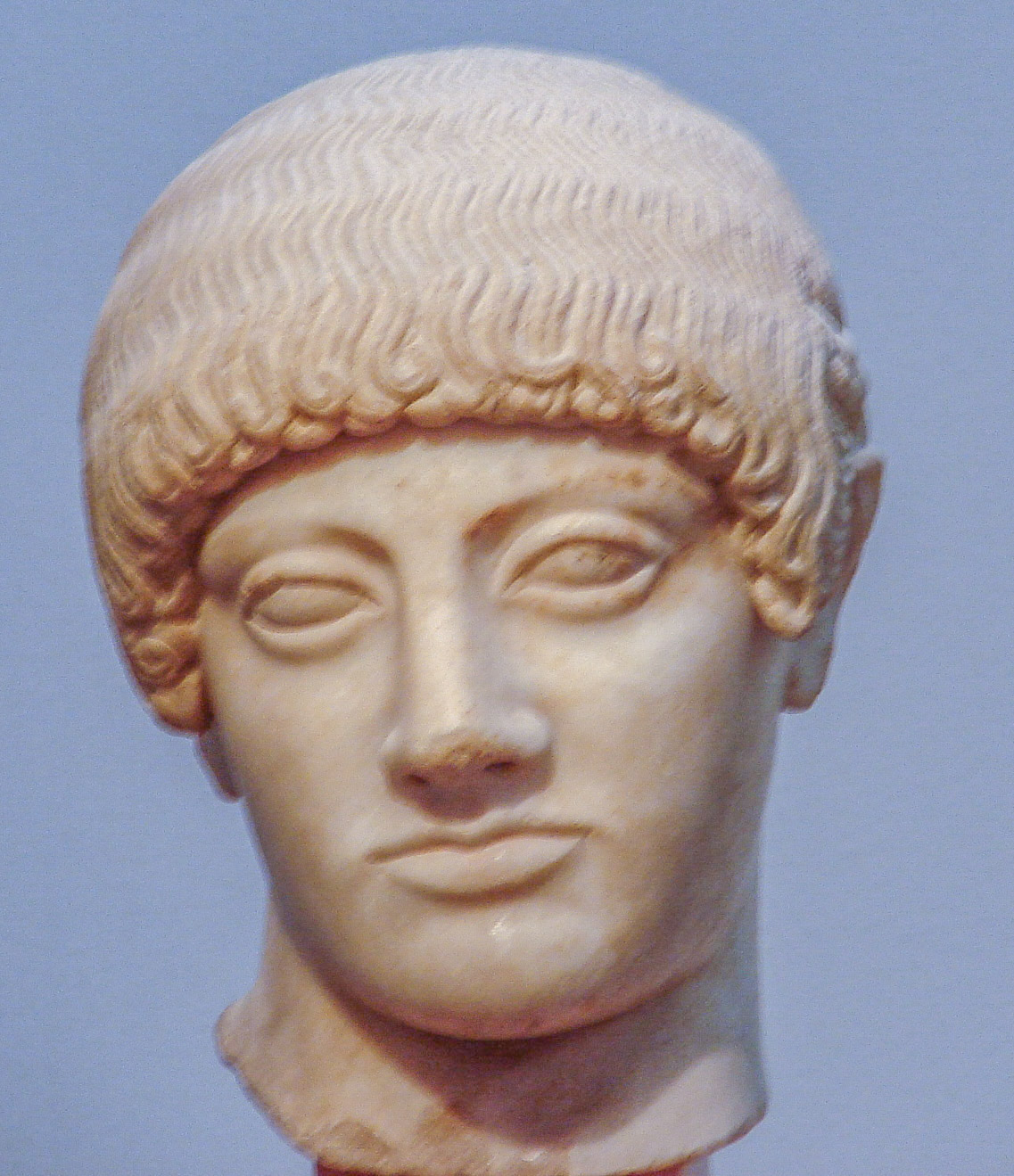
The Blond Kouros Head

- Blond Kouros's Head of the Acropolis
- Caryatids
- Kouros and Kore
- Kritios Boy
- Metopes of the Parthenon
- Moscophoros
- Nike Adjusting Her Sandal
- Parthenon Frieze
- Temple of Athena Nike frieze

== See also ==
- Erechtheion
- Perserschutt
- List of museums in Greece
