= Panos Valavanis =

Greek classical archaeologist (1954–2025)

Panos Valavanis (Greek: Πάνος Βαλαβάνης; 1954 – 14 May 2025) was a Greek classical archaeologist.

== Life and career ==
Panos Valavanis was born in 1954. He studied at the University of Athens and the University of Würzburg. From 1980 onwards, he worked at the University of Athens, where from 2000 he was a professor extraordinarius in classical archaeology. Valavanis did research on Greek pottery and Greek vase painting, on the architecture and topography of ancient Athens, on ancient technology, and on ancient sports. For his book Games and Sanctuaries in Ancient Greece, a foreword was written by John Boardman.

He was a corresponding member of the Deutsches Archäologisches Institut.

Valavanis died of cancer on 14 May 2025, at the age of 71.

== Selected publications ==
- Hysplex. The Starting Mechanism in Ancient Stadia. A Contribution to Ancient Greek Technology, University of California Press, Los Angeles 1999 ISBN 9780520098299
- Games and Sanctuaries in Ancient Greece, Getty Publications, Los Angeles 2004. ISBN 0-89236-762-8 Review by Paul Christesen in Bryn Mawr Classical Review 2005.01.20
