= Panagiotis Kavvadias =

Greek archaeologist (1850–1928)

- Παναγιώτης Καββαδίας
- Born: 14 May [O.S. 2 May] 1850; Kothreas, Kephallonia, United States of the Ionian Islands
- Died: 20 July 1928 (aged 78); Athens, Greece
- Education: National University of Athens; Ludwig-Maximilians-Universität München
- Occupation: Archaeologist
- Employer: Greek Archaeological Service
- Known for: Excavations in Greece, particularly at Epidaurus and the Acropolis of Athens
- Title: Ephor General (1885–1909)
- Children: Alexander Polycleitos; Epameinondas

Panagiotis Kavvadias or Cawadias (Note: Towards the end of his life, Kavvadias and his family used the spelling 'Cawadias' in English.) (Greek: Παναγιώτης Καββαδίας; 14 May [O.S. 2 May] 1850 – 20 July 1928) (Note: Greece adopted the Gregorian calendar in 1923; 28 February [O.S. 15 February] was followed by 1 March. In this article, this date and all subsequent dates are given in the 'New Style' Gregorian calendar, while dates before it are given in the 'Old Style' Julian calendar.) was a Greek archaeologist. He was responsible for the excavation of ancient sites in Greece, including Epidaurus in Argolis and the Acropolis of Athens, as well as archaeological discoveries on his native island of Kephallonia. As Ephor General (the head of the Greek Archaeological Service) from 1885 until 1909, Kavvadias oversaw the expansion of the Archaeological Service and the introduction of Law 2646 of the year 1899, which increased the state's powers to address the illegal excavation and smuggling of antiquities.

Kavvadias's work had a particular impact on the Acropolis of Athens, and has been credited with completing its "transformation [...] from castle to monument". Between 1885 and 1890, he removed almost all of the Acropolis's remaining medieval and modern structures, uncovering many ancient monuments in the process. He also played a role in the extensive reconstruction of the site by the architect and engineer Nikolaos Balanos. Though praised initially, the work caused considerable damage to several monuments and was almost completely deconstructed and rebuilt during the later 20th and early 21st centuries. Kavvadias oversaw the opening of the National Archaeological Museum in Athens, organised its first collections, and wrote some of its first catalogues.

As an administrator, Kavvadias was regarded as energetic, centralising and autocratic. His career saw significant modernisation in the practice of archaeology in Greece, and he reformed and professionalised the Archaeological Service. His patronage of Athens's foreign archaeological schools was credited with promoting the development of Greek archaeology, but was also criticised by native Greek archaeologists. He created further discontent among the Archaeological Society of Athens by reducing its role in favour of the governmental Archaeological Service. After the Goudi coup of 1909, dissatisfaction in the Greek press and among his subordinates in the Archaeological Service led to his removal from office, from the Archaeological Society and from his professorship at the National University of Athens, though he was able to return to public and academic life from 1912, and remained active in Greek archaeology until his death in 1928.

== Early life and education ==
Panagiotis Kavvadias was born on 14 May [O.S. 2 May] 1850 in Kothreas, a village on the island of Kephallonia. (Note: In his obituary of Kavvadias, Bosanquet gives the date as 1 May 1851, without specifying a calendar. Kavvadias's obituary in the British Medical Journal states that he died at the age of eighty, which would make his year of birth either 1847 or 1848.) His family had been prominent during the Venetokratia, the period of Venetian occupation which lasted from 1500 until the French conquest of 1797. At the time of his birth, Kephallonia and the other Ionian Islands were a protectorate of the United Kingdom; they were transferred to Greece in 1864.

Kavvadias studied philology at the National University of Athens, and was awarded a scholarship by the Greek government for postgraduate study at the Ludwig-Maximilians-Universität München. At the Ludwig-Maximilians-Universität München, he studied archaeology under Heinrich Brunn. Brunn, credited as "perhaps the foremost German archaeologist of [his] era", had revolutionised the study of Greek art history in the 1850s through his methodical, analytical study of literary texts alongside works of art. His use of the anatomical details of ancient sculpture to draw conclusions about its chronology, place of origin and authorship has been called the most important influence in the nineteenth-century "narrowing and sharpening" of the discipline of Classical art history, and therefore in moving the basis of the discipline away from connoisseurship towards empirical observation. Kavvadias later credited Brunn as a great influence on his own archaeological practice. Kavvadias also followed a course in epigraphy at the Collège de France in Paris under Paul Foucart, (Note: For Foucart's position at the Collège de France, see Berlin-Brandenburgische Akademie der Wissenschaften 2023.) a French epigrapher later credited as "the doyen of our field" by the classical archaeologist Salomon Reinach, and also studied in Berlin, London and Rome.

== Archaeological career ==
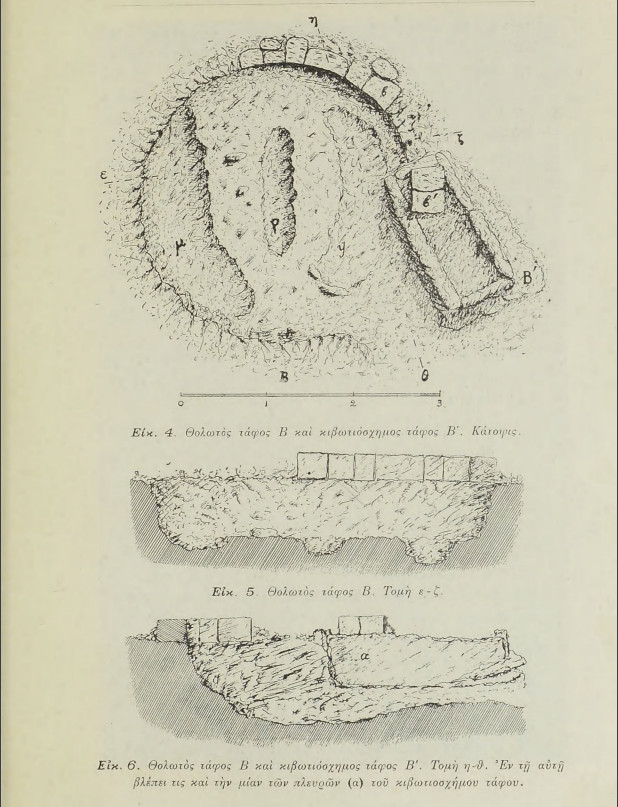
Plan and section of tholos tomb 'B' at Kokolata, Kephallonia, made by Kavvadis for the publication of the site

After finishing his studies, Kavvadias returned to Greece, where he entered the Archaeological Service. In 1879, he was appointed as an ephor, an official with the responsibility of supervising, managing and protecting archaeological heritage – the first such official to be retained by the Archaeological Service in addition to the Ephor General, its professional head. In 1881, he published a short history of Greek archaeology. One of his first postings was to the excavations of the French School at Athens on the island of Delos, which had been running since 1873: he was there in 1882, working alongside Reinach, who later wrote that Kavvadias had seemed "full of enthusiasm and ambition".

The first major excavations Kavvadias led personally were at Epidaurus in Argolis, which began in March 1881. In their first year, the excavations uncovered the theatre, and subsequently revealed several buildings and inscriptions within the Sanctuary of Asclepius and the nearby Sanctuary of Apollo Maleatas on Mount Kynortion. Following the retirement of Panagiotis Efstratiadis in 1884 and the death of his successor, Panagiotis Stamatakis, less than a year later, Kavvadias was elevated to the position of Ephor General in 1885. He handed over responsibility for the site to his protégé Valerios Stais, but continued both to work at the site and publish the results of its excavation until his death in 1928.

Kavvadias excavated frequently around Kephallonia, aiming to discover so-called 'Homeric' sites (Note: That is, sites named in the Homeric epics or which could be dated to the Late Bronze Age, which was considered to be the period of the Trojan War.) and remains of Odysseus's Ithaca. He made his first excavations on the acropolis of the island of Same, near the island known in modern times as Ithaca, in 1883. Kavvadias uncovered a gate, but considered his finds insignificant as the only material uncovered dated from the Archaic to the Roman period (that is, c. 850 BCE – c. 500 CE), rather than the 'Homeric' Late Bronze Age (c. 1600 – c. 1180 BCE). In 1889, he discovered Mycenaean chamber tombs and fragments of Mycenaean vessels in the area of Leivatho, near the village of Mazarakata, which provided the first proof of the presence of Mycenaean civilisation on the island. He excavated again at Same and Leivatho in 1899, with funding from Adriaan Goekoop, a wealthy Dutch amateur archaeologist, finding more structures on Same but none which predated the Classical period. He carried out further work on the island in 1908, in 1909 – when he discovered two small Mycenaean tholos tombs at Kokolata – and in 1913.

Kavvadias published the first reports of his excavations in the Government Gazette (Greek: Ἐφημερίς τῆς Κυβερνήσεως), an official publication normally used for laws and royal decrees. The Archaeological Service had lacked an official publication since 1860, when it had ceased to produce the Archaeological Newsletter (Ἀρχαιολογικὴ Ἐφημερίς), taken on in 1862 by the Archaeological Society of Athens as its own journal. Instead, news of its excavations and activities was normally released in journals or newsletters. In 1888, Kavvadias began to publish the monthly Archaeological Bulletin (Ἀρχαιολογικὸν Δελτίον) on behalf of the Service. He edited all of its volumes between 1885 and 1892 himself, after which publication of the journal ceased until 1915.

During his period as Ephor General between 1885 and 1909, Kavvadias's main project was the excavation and subsequent restoration of the Acropolis of Athens. Until 1890, in collaboration with the German archaeologist and architect Georg Kawerau, he excavated or re-excavated almost the whole site, removing nearly all of its remaining post-Classical structures and discovering dozens of works of ancient sculpture, particularly Archaic korai. After 1890, the work on the Acropolis primarily consisted of restoration, particularly of the Parthenon, Erechtheion and Propylaia, overseen by Nikolaos Balanos, who directed the project largely independently.

Kavvadias initiated the excavation of the Kabeirion in Boeotia in 1887, later continued by the German Archaeological Institute at Athens. In 1889, he was given permission to initiate excavations at the sanctuary of Lykosoura in Arcadia, which he took to be the sanctuary of Despoina described by the Ancient Greek geographer Pausanias. (Note: Cardete del Olmo 2004, p. 232. For Pausanias' description, see Pausanias, Description of Greece 8.37.3–4.) These excavations were conducted in their first season by Vasileios Leonardos, and in 1890 by Kavvadias himself. (Note: The 1890 season was forced to halt after local residents protested that they had not been given, as the law required, half of the proceeds of the excavation.) They uncovered the temple of Despoina and discovered part of a cult group of statues – the work of the Messenian sculptor Damophon – showing Despoina seated on a double throne alongside Demeter, accompanied by Artemis and the Titan Anytos. In 1900, during rescue excavations in the Outer Kerameikos, he uncovered the Nessos Amphora, a late seventh-century BCE amphora which he took to be a container for a cremation burial from the nearby Dipylon cemetery. In modern times, the vase has become the name-piece of the Nessos Painter, and was described by John Beazley as the "chief example" of early black-figure vase painting, as well as establishing the Nessos Painter as "the earliest Greek artist whose personality we can grasp." (Note: James Whitley credits these remarks to Beazley's "scholarly personality", rather than his co-author Ashmole's.)

Between 1902 and 1903, he excavated the Heraion of Samos alongside the future prime minister, Themistoklis Sofoulis, then a lecturer at the National University of Athens. He also oversaw the first reconstruction of the Temple of Apollo at Bassae, excavated by Konstantinos Kourouniotis, between 1902 and 1908. According to his obituary in the Greek newspaper Skrip, he also served as director of the archaeological department of the Ministry of Education.

== Excavations at Epidaurus (1881–1928) ==
On 28 March [O.S. 15 March] 1881, Kavvadias began excavations on behalf of the Archaeological Society of Athens at Epidaurus, with the aim of uncovering the theatre described by Pausanias. These were the first excavations undertaken by the Society outside Athens, apart from minor and small-scale rescue excavations. In 1881, the excavations uncovered the theatre, as well as two stelae (inscribed stone slabs) in the Sanctuary of Asclepius. The stelae, dating to the late fourth or early third century BCE and sometimes called 'miracle inscriptions', recorded the names of at least twenty individuals and the means by which they were healed – usually miraculous dreams or visions. The excavation and publication of these stelae contributed significantly to Kavvadias's early archaeological reputation.

In 1882, Kavvadias uncovered the tholos (circular temple) and the Temple of Asclepius, followed by the abaton (Note: The main part of the healing sanctuary, in which patients slept during the ritual of incubation.) in 1883. (Note: Glotz 1928, p. 270 (for the excavation and its date): for the identification of this structure as the abaton, see Dignas 2010, p. 168.) In 1884, he excavated the Temple of Artemis and the Great Propylaia, and reconstructed a row of columns in the western stoa of the abaton. The excavations continued until 1927: Valerios Stais, whom Kavvadias appointed as an ephor of the Archaeological Service in 1885, joined them as a supervisor in early 1886, after Kavvadias's elevation to Ephor General, and became field director in 1887.

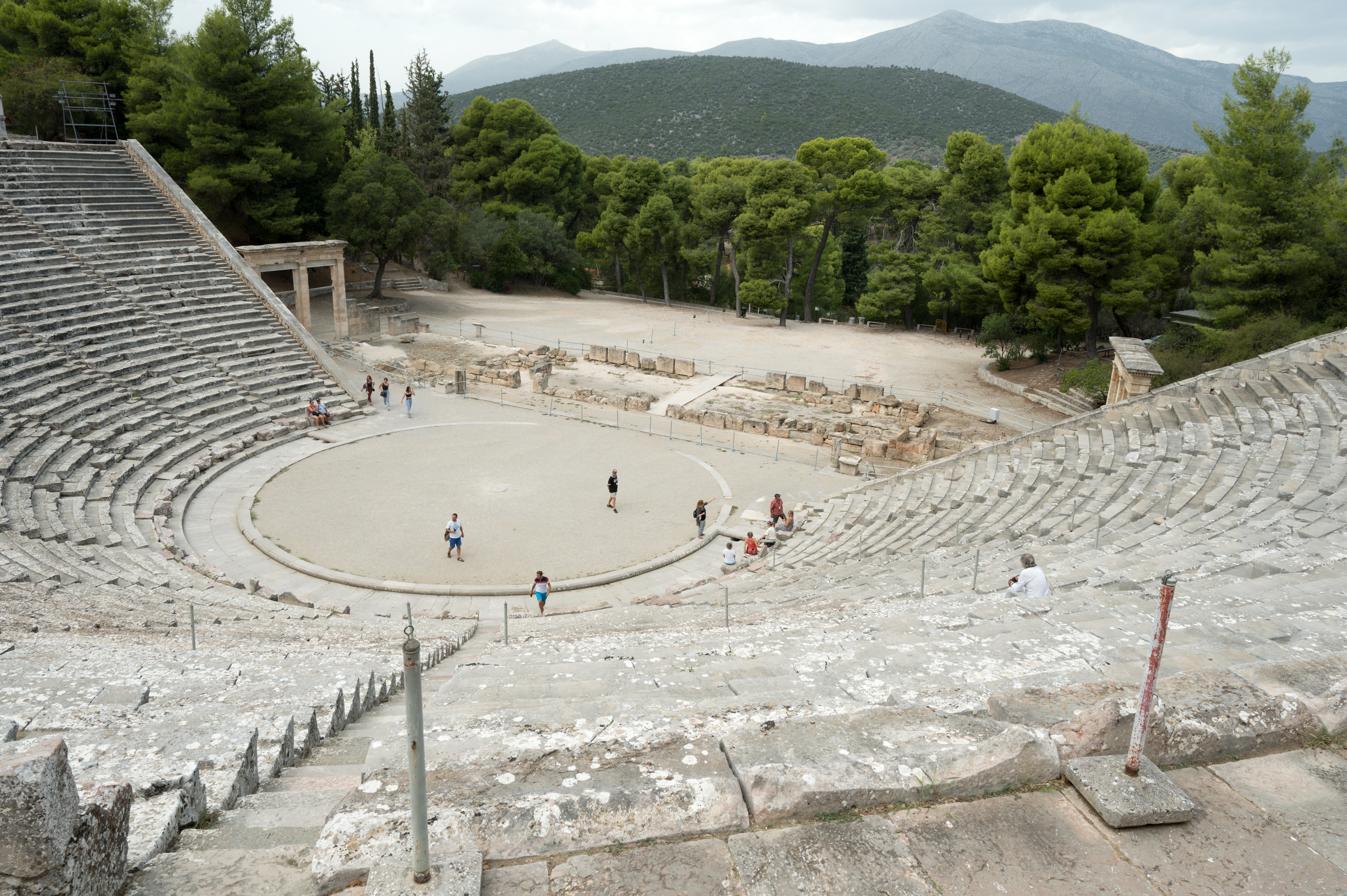
The Theatre of Epidaurus, excavated by Kavvadias in 1881

In 1896, Kavvadias excavated the first parts of the nearby Sanctuary of Apollo Maleatas on Mount Kynortion. That year, the French architectural historian Charles Chipiez described the excavation of Epidaurus as "of capital importance to the history of Greek architecture", though he criticised the restrained and limited reconstructions drawn up by the German Wilhelm Dörpfeld, who worked with Kavvadias and illustrated his publication of the excavations, in favour of the more lavish reconstructions created in 1895 by the French architect Alphonse Defrasse – reconstructions which, by the later 20th century, were considered largely erroneous. Kavvadias's report on his excavations of the Roman-period odeion at the site, which he published in 1900, has been described as "invaluable" for the amount of evidence it preserves, much of which has been lost through later deterioration in the building's condition.

Kavvadias returned to Epidaurus throughout his career: in a 1929 obituary, the British archaeologist Robert Carr Bosanquet wrote that the summer excavation season there was "almost the only holiday [Kavvadias] permitted himself". In 1902, he discovered the first parts of a building adjacent to the stadium (which had already been discovered by 1893), connected directly to it by means of an entrance tunnel. The findings from the building's excavation were never fully published; in 1992, the archaeologist Stephen G. Miller suggested that it may have been an apodyterion (changing room) for the athletes. In 1903, Kavvadias published part of the inscription upon a third stele, detailing further accounts of miraculous healings; he published the inscription in full in 1918. In his last excavation season at Epidaurus, which lasted from June 1928 until shortly before his death in July, he uncovered an elaborate building, possibly used by athletes preparing for competition, to the north of the stadium.

The excavation of Epidaurus has been described as a "landmark", both for its place in the institutional history of Greek archaeology and for the finds uncovered there. Reinach called the excavations one of Kavvadias's "two immortal daughters", the other being his work on the Acropolis of Athens. Kavvadias was more ambivalent about his work there: when showing a fellow archaeologist, Stratis Paraskeviadis, around the site, he pointed to the theatre and said "there I sacrificed and destroyed". Vasileios Petrakos, a historian of Greek archaeology, has suggested that he may have been alluding to the clearing of an expansive forest which had originally covered the ruins.

== Excavations and restorations on the Acropolis (1885–1909) ==
Areas of the Acropolis of Athens excavated by Kavvadias and Kawerau between 1885 and 1890. Monuments discovered during the excavations are shown in red.

=== Excavations with Kawerau (1885–1890) ===
Kavvadias's predecessor as Ephor General of Antiquities, Panagiotis Stamatakis, had planned to complete the excavation of the Acropolis of Athens, but died suddenly in 1884 before work could commence. Kavvadias therefore carried out the excavations with funding from the Archaeological Society of Athens. He undertook the work, which lasted from 23 November [O.S. 11 November] 1885 until the end of 1890, in collaboration with the German architect Georg Kawerau. Kavvadias excavated the entire Acropolis down to bedrock, leaving, as he claimed, "not the slightest quantity of soil ... which has not been investigated." (Note: Quoted in Mallouchou-Tufano 2007, p. 51.) All remaining post-Classical buildings on the site were demolished. The excavation has been described as "unsystematic": it has also been criticised for keeping no record of stratigraphy, and for only making partial records through drawing and photography.

Throughout 1885, the excavations moved from the western side of the Acropolis, beginning near the Propylaia (the monumental gateway to the site), towards the east. In 1886, three areas were added: the part of the North Circuit Wall between the Erechtheion and the Propylaia; the area between the Parthenon and the Erechtheion (which contained the remains of the Archaios Naos or "Old Temple of Athena") and the area east of the Parthenon. In 1887, Kavvadias excavated the area to the east of the Erechtheion, along the East Circuit Wall to the Belvedere tower, and from the Belvedere tower to the area between the Parthenon and the Acropolis Museum. In 1888, he excavated the area around the museum, as well as the area between the Parthenon and the South Circuit Wall, and uncovered the Parthenon's stylobate to its full depth of 14 metres (46 ft), or twenty-two levels of masonry. In 1889, most of the southern and western part of the Acropolis was cleared of post-Classical remains, as were the interiors of the Parthenon and the Pinakotheke (a chamber in the monument's northern wing) of the Propylaia. Finally, in 1890, Kavvadias cleared the route onto the Acropolis from the Beulé Gate.

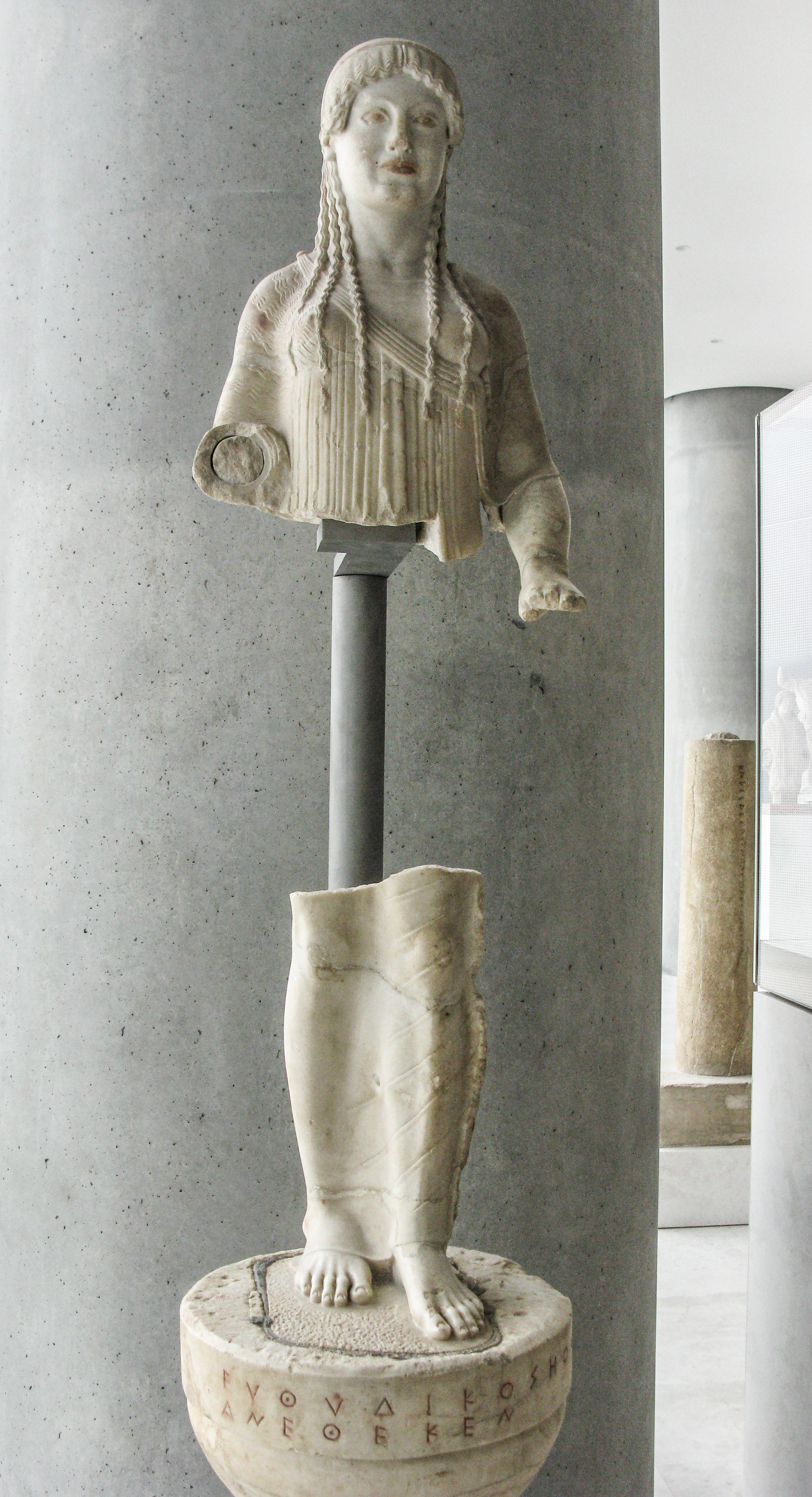
The Euthydikos Kore. The top of the statue was excavated by Panagiotis Efstratiadis in 1882; Kavvadias found the lower part in 1886 or 1887.

The excavations uncovered thousands of fragments of Archaic and pre-Classical art – the largest quantity of such material ever discovered. In particular, the 1887 and 1888 excavations found the remaining parts of the sculptures of the Hekatompedon pediment, and a group of Herakles and the Hydra, which once formed the pediment of another structure. Much of this material came from the so-called Perserschutt, the layer of debris left by the Persian destruction of the Acropolis in 480 BCE and the ritual burial of the damaged statuary by the Athenians after the Persian Wars. A particularly fruitful area was the so-called 'kore pit', north-west of the Erechtheion, which is the major known source for kore and kouros sculptures of the Archaic period: Kavvadias uncovered somewhere between nine and fourteen korai in the initial excavation alone. Other notable finds from the Perserschutt included the Persian Rider sculpture.

Kavvadias also excavated an early Christian church, as well as significant remains of Mycenaean fortification of the western side of the Acropolis near the Propylaia. On the northern side of the Acropolis, Kavvadias excavated in 1887 a cave (later identified by the archaeologist Oscar Broneer as part of the Sanctuary of Eros and Aphrodite) in which he found pieces of black-figure pottery, the head of a female sculpture, and what he believed were traces of the secret route described by Pausanias as being used by the arrephoroi during the rite of the Arrhephoria. (Note: Rosenzweig 2004, p. 56. For Pausanias's description of the route, see Pausanias, Description of Greece 1.27.3.) Modern research by Rachel Rosenzweig has questioned whether this secret route, only vaguely described by Pausanias, ever truly existed. His excavations also uncovered the remains of the Archaic 'Building B' beneath the Pinakotheke of the Propylaia, as well as the Brauroneion, the Chalkotheke and the Temple of Roma and Augustus. The archaeological finds from the excavations, including sculptures, vases, architectural remains, figurines and inscriptions, became the core of the collection of the Old Acropolis Museum. Kavvadias's work has been described by the archaeological historian Fani Mallouchou-Tufano as finishing "the transformation of the [Acropolis] from castle to monument". The demolished structures included a late Roman reservoir near the Propylaia, a structure known as the tholos near the Erechtheion, a medieval building to the south of the Parthenon, as well as various Late Roman fortifications. Kavvadias also removed the 'walls' or 'panels' (Greek: πίνακες, romanised: pinakes), built by his predecessor Kyriakos Pittakis from various scattered antiquities. Pittakis had intended the pinakes to prevent looting, but had been criticised in the contemporary press for presenting artefacts of different periods and provenances together, and for breaking up groups of sculptures that originally formed single ensembles into different pinakes.

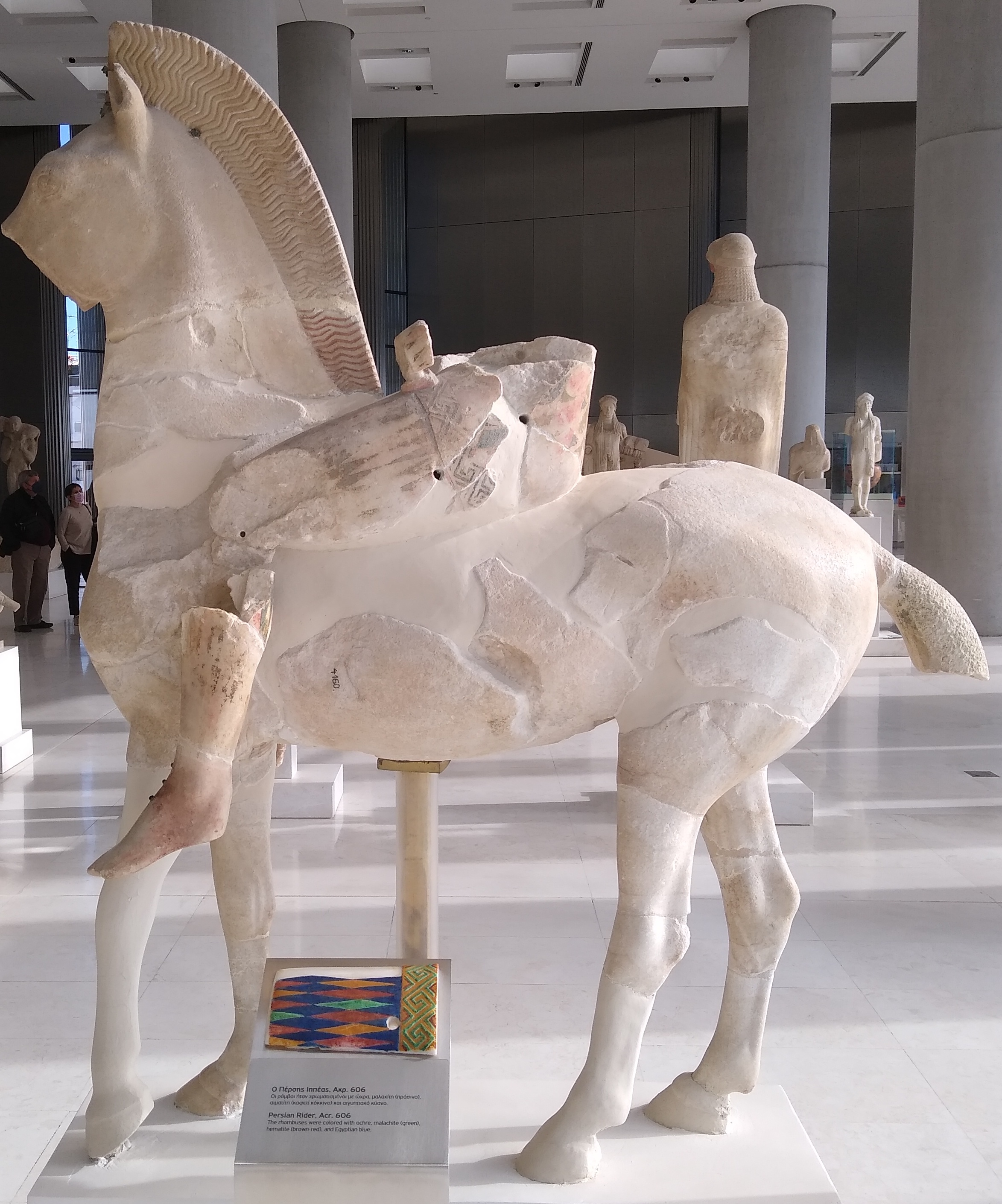
The Persian Rider sculpture, discovered by Kavvadias in the Perserschutt between 1885 and 1890

Kavvadias made minor excavations in the caves on the northern side of the Acropolis during 1896 and 1897, uncovering one with what he believed to be the remains of an altar, as well as ten marble plaques with inscriptions marking them as a dedication to Apollo, who was identified by the epithet 'under the cliffs' (ὑπὸ Μάκραις or ὑπ' Ἄκρας). The inscriptions, dating from between 40 CE and the later 3rd century CE, identified the dedicators as senior Athenian officials ('archons') and their secretaries from the Roman period, which has given the site the name of the 'Archons' Cult'. Between 1887 and 1888, a second museum, nicknamed the 'little one' (μικρό; mikro), was built by Kawerau to the east of the main Acropolis museum, in the area of the building generally known as the Sanctuary of Pandion. During the Acropolis Museum's expansion in the 1950s, it was demolished and the space incorporated into the main structure.

=== Balanos's restorations (1894–1909) ===
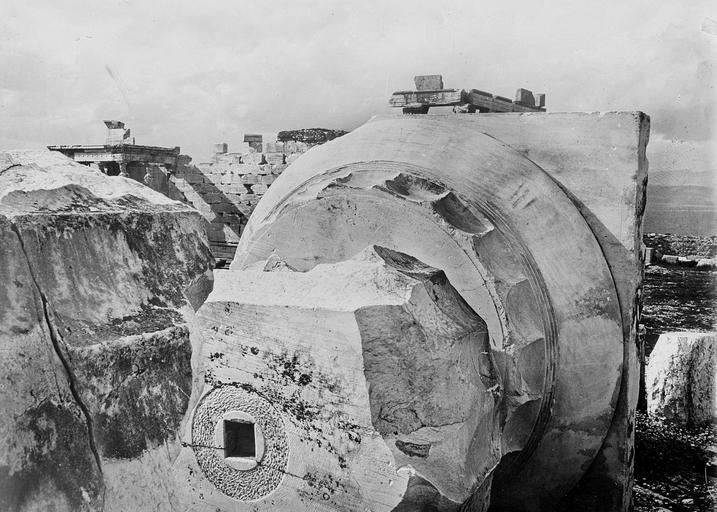
A capital of the Parthenon lying on its side in 1899

The Atalanti earthquakes of 1894 damaged the Parthenon, causing the fall of parts of its opisthodomos (rear porch). The Archaeological Service, led by Kavvadias, commissioned the architects Francis Penrose, Josef Durm and Lucien Magne to investigate possible responses, and decided upon a partial reconstruction which would strengthen the damaged parts and replace, where necessary, ancient marble with modern. They also decided to use, as far as possible, the original building methods (dry-stone masonry held together with metal clamps) in the restoration work, and Kavvadias later wrote in favour of this approach. A full-scale reconstruction was ruled out, and the primary aim of the project was defined as strengthening the extent parts of the building which had suffered damage.

Penrose, Durm and Magne formed a supervising committee, but the operational direction was delegated to the 'Committee for the Conservation of the Parthenon', a body which included academics, members of Athens's foreign schools of archaeology, and representatives of the Greek government. Nikolaos Balanos, Athens's Chief Engineer of Public Works, was invited to join this committee after its formation, and effectively took control of the reconstructions, operating, according to Mallouchou-Tufano, "independently and unchecked".

Between 1898 and 1909, Balanos worked almost continuously on the Parthenon, the Erechtheion and the Propylaia. (Note: His work on the Propylaia continued after 1909, when Kavvadias was removed as ephor general, until 1917, and Balanos made further restorations on the Parthenon and the Temple of Athena Nike until 1939.) His work was financed by the General Ephorate of Antiquities, of which Kavvadias was head, and by the Archaeological Society of Athens, of which Kavvadias was secretary. The restorations were initially praised by contemporaries, but were later criticised for their invasive methodology and for the lack of archaeological expertise shown in some of the work. Balanos's use of reinforced concrete to fill the gaps in marble masonry led to water ingress and the corrosion of the iron clamps used to reinforce the structure, cracking the marble and causing blocks to fall apart. In the Erechtheion, this problem was compounded by corrosion caused by the exposure of the original Caryatid sculptures to air pollution. In 1977, a programme was announced to address the consequences of Balanos's restorations, which included the removal of the Caryatids to the Acropolis Museum and their replacement on the temple by replicas, and eventually involved (at least partially) dismantling and rebuilding every structure on which Balanos had worked.

== Ephor General of Antiquities (1885–1909) ==
In 1885, Kavvadias, the favoured candidate of Prime Minister Charilaos Trikoupis, succeeded Panagiotis Stamatakis as Ephor General of Antiquities, the head of the Greek Archaeological Service. Kavvadias's time as Ephor General saw the opening of the National Archaeological Museum of Athens in 1889. He took a centralising approach to its collection, which he composed of material from all over Greece, except for Olympia and Delphi. He produced two catalogues of its sculptures, published in 1890 and 1892, assisted by Christos Tsountas for the prehistoric material.

Under Kavvadias's leadership, the Archaeological Service expanded its portfolio of museums in Greece, building on the work of his predecessor Stamatakis in opening museums for local archaeological collections around the country. Kavvadias assisted with the planning and design of the Heraklion Archaeological Museum in Ottoman-ruled Crete, which opened in 1883, drawing up the plan for the museum's Neoclassical buildings in collaboration with Wilhelm Dörpfeld. In 1909, he was invited, along with the historian George Soteriadis and other members of the Archaeological Society, to arrange the first collections of the Cyprus Museum. (Note: Cyprus was, at this time, a British protectorate known as British Cyprus.)

Between 1901 and 1905, Kavvadias organised the First International Archaeological Conference, which was held in Athens from 14–26 April [O.S. 1–13 April] 1905. The conference has been described as a "flanking move" by Kavvadias to diminish the influence of the Archaeological Society in favour of the Archaeological Service: the Archaeological Society protested at the government's ownership of the conference, represented by Kavvadias and the Minister for Education, Emmanuel Stais. Pressure from the Society also forced Kavvadias to reverse his decision to exclude Greek archaeologists from the conference.

Kavvadias spoke at the funeral of the German archaeologist Heinrich Schliemann in the First Cemetery of Athens on 4 January 1891 [O.S. 23 December 1890], giving a short eulogy in Greek. He credited Schliemann with much of the creation of the study of Greek prehistory, and expressed his view that Greek archaeology was both "peculiarly Greek" and had "the whole civilised world for its home." He was elected as a professor of the National University of Athens on 24 February [O.S. 11 February] 1904, alongside Tsountas, by a vote of seventeen to two of the nineteen professor-electors present.

=== Reorganisation of the Archaeological Service ===
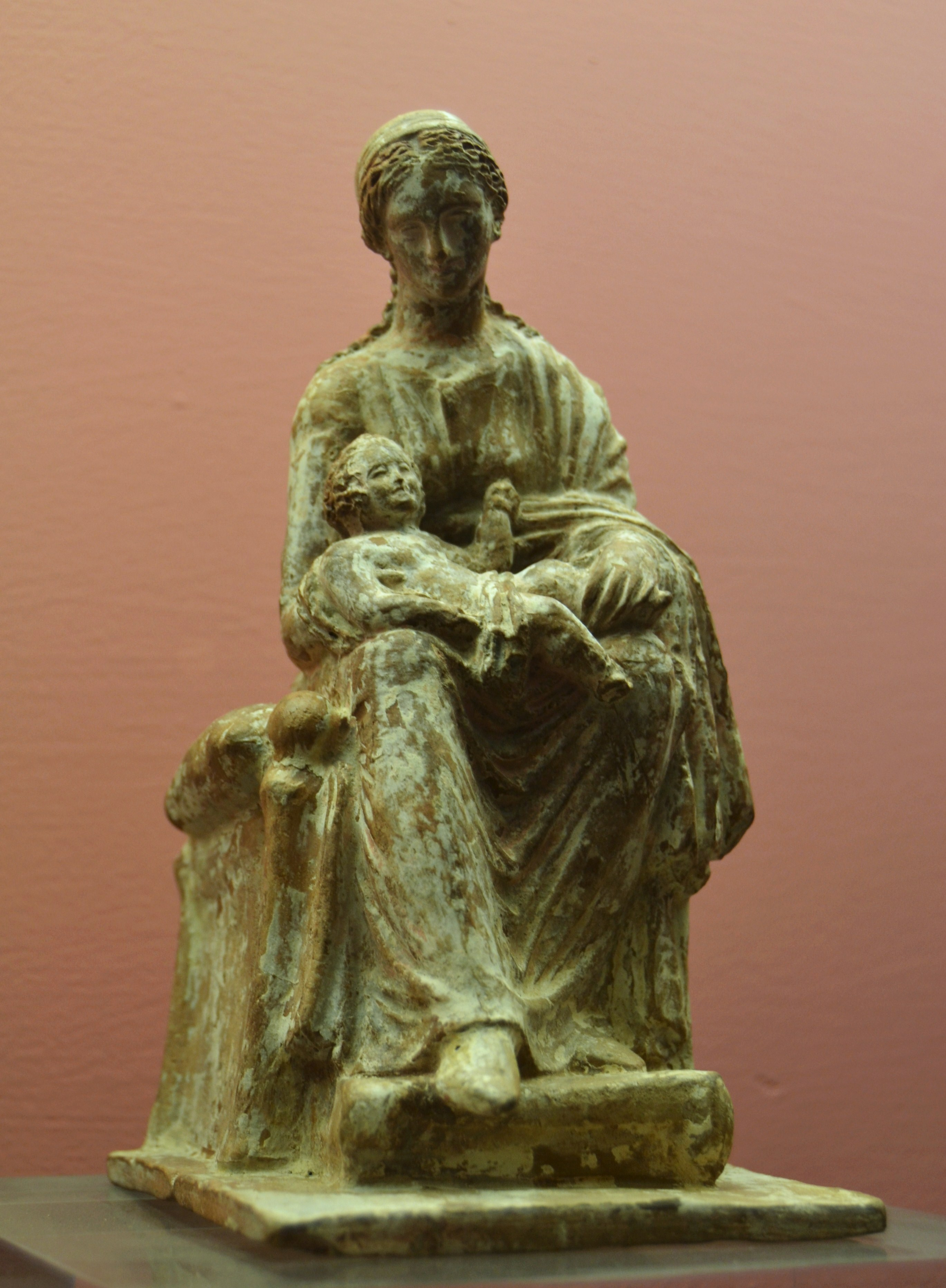
Terracotta figurine from Tanagra, Hellenistic period. The looting of figurines like this provided the impetus behind the toughened archaeological law of 1899.

Kavvadias's own appointment in 1879, made by Panagiotis Efstratiadis, had marked the beginning of the expansion of the Archaeological Service, raising the number of its ephors from one to two. Kavvadias continued the recruitment of new ephors: by the end of his tenure, the Service had recruited over a dozen (having previously employed only the Ephor General between 1836 and 1866), (Note: In 1866, Panagiotis Stamatakis was hired as an assistant to Panagiotis Efstratiadis, a position he held until Efstratiadis's retirement in 1884.) including Habbo Gerhard Lolling and Konstantinos Kourouniotis, and established operations on the island of Crete, then an autonomous province of the Ottoman Empire. He also imposed the first formal academic criteria for ephors – his predecessor as Ephor General, Panagiotis Stamatakis, had received no university education or formal archaeological training – requiring that all ephors be graduates of the National University of Athens, and either to have undertaken postgraduate study in archaeology or to pass an examination in archaeology, history, Ancient Greek and Latin. In 1887, he imposed the stricter requirement that all potential ephors hold a doctorate in either philology or archaeology, and that they subsequently pass an interview before a board composed of professors of classics, archaeology and history, which included the Ephor General.

Kavvadias created much of the bureaucratic apparatus of the modern Archaeological Service. Through a royal decree of 7 December [O.S. 25 November] 1885, he established the Archaeological Receipts Fund, which used the proceeds of the sales of tickets, casts and catalogues by museums to fund the conservation and restoration of ancient monuments. He was also behind the Royal Decree of 20 January [O.S. 8 January] 1886, which created the first systematic division of Greece into archaeological regions.

== Archaeological Society of Athens ==
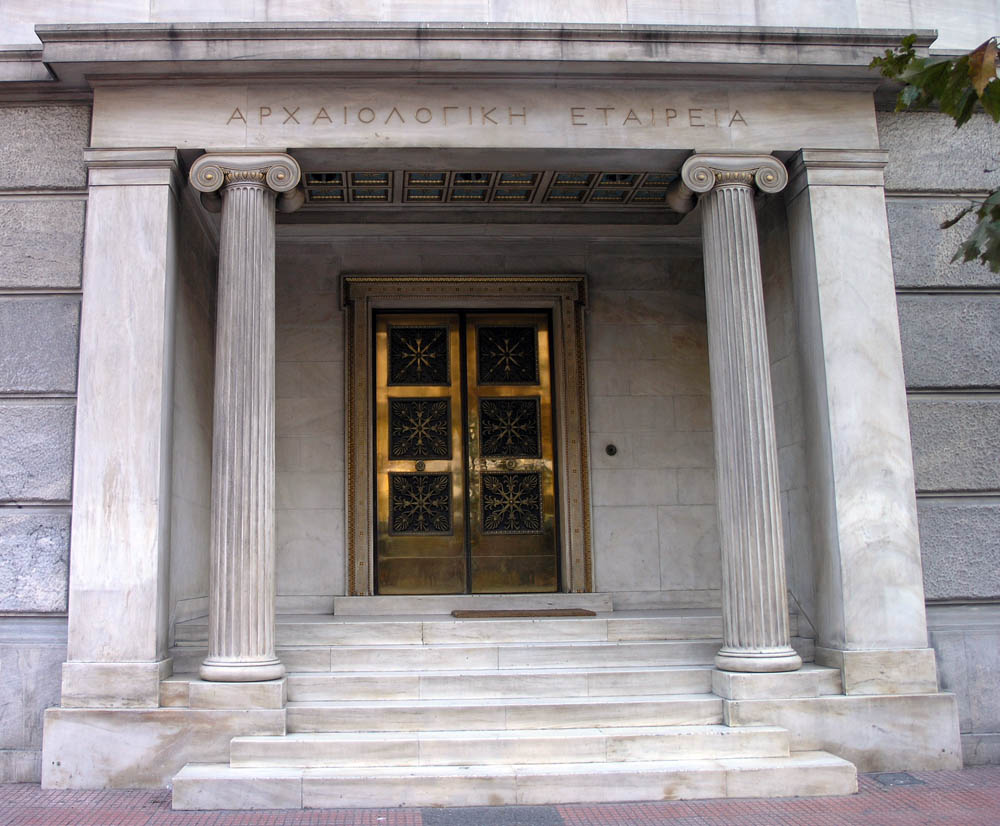
The present-day premises of the Archaeological Society of Athens, at 22 Panepistemou Street, opened during Kavvadias's secretariat in 1899.

Kavvadias was an active member of the Archaeological Society of Athens, a learned society with a significant role in organising excavations and protecting cultural heritage in Greece. In particular, he mounted a long-running campaign to become secretary of the society, which has been interpreted by Petrakos, a later secretary and historian of the Archaeological Society, as a means of bringing its financial revenues under the effective control of the state. From at least 1886, when Kavvadias intervened on behalf of the government in an investigation into the society's financial mismanagement, he acted to increase the influence of the General Ephorate over its affairs, creating animosity between the state and the society which had become noticed and regularly remarked upon in the press by 1888. Although the Archaeological Society had traditionally supported the aims of the state, tensions had already begun to develop between the society and the Archaeological Service, particularly as the society often bore the cost for work initiated by Kavvadias in his capacity as the Service's Ephor General, and ephors employed by the society were often seconded to work for the government: the society voted to end this practice in 1882.

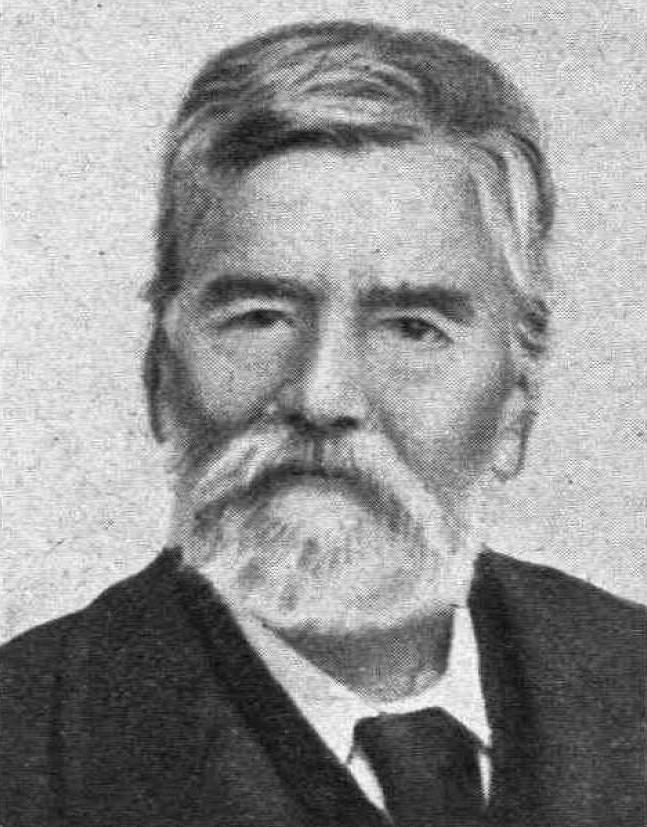
Stefanos Koumanoudis, whom Kavvadias replaced as secretary of the Archaeological Society of Athens

Kavvadias intensified his efforts to gain control of the society in 1894, using his own allies in the press and within the society to attack its secretary, Stefanos Koumanoudis. In December 1894, elections were held for the society's officers: Koumanoudis was re-elected as secretary, but resigned in protest after one of Kavvadias's allies was also appointed to the council. Several of the newly elected officers followed Koumanoudis: Dimitrios Filios resigned on 11 January 1895 [O.S. 30 December 1894], followed by the numismatist Ioannis Svoronos on 14 January [O.S. 2 January] 1895 and the folklorist Nikolaos Politis. Kavvadias therefore became secretary by a near-unanimous vote on 18 January [O.S. 6 January]. Svoronos was briefly imprisoned later in 1895 after Kavvadias sued him for insulting remarks Svoronos made about him at the society's general assembly on 4 August [O.S. 23 July].

As secretary, Kavvadias increased the society's revenues as well as its activities in both excavations and restorations. He initiated the drafting in 1895 of a new constitution for the society, which expanded its sphere of operations and made the Crown Prince of Greece, Constantine, its president. He also oversaw the society's move to new premises in 1899, and wrote a history of it to commemorate the occasion.

== Efforts against antiquities crime ==
By the 1880s, it was clear that the legal mechanisms available for the protection of cultural heritage were inadequate to the challenge posed by illegal excavations and export of antiquities. The main law governing antiquities was the Archaeological Law of 22 May [O.S. 10 May] 1834, which has been described as "loosely interpreted and even more loosely enforced": antiquities from unauthorised, illegal excavations were openly advertised for sale both within and outside Greece. Under the 1834 law, antiquities discovered on private land could remain in private possession, despite legally being jointly owned by the state and the private 'owners': this created ambiguity which reduced the state's ability to control antiquities. In the early 1870s, the looting of the necropolis of Tanagra had seen some 10,000 tombs robbed and hundreds of antiquities, including vases and figurines, sold abroad, which outraged the Greek press and raised the issue of archaeological crime among the general population. During his tenure as Ephor General between 1864 and 1884, Panagiotis Efstratiadis had attempted to work against looters and smugglers, but was hamstrung by the legal framework then in place. In 1866, he was legally forced to permit an excavation on private land by two Athenian art dealers, despite his distrust of their intentions. He was also unable to prevent the export of significant antiquities, such as the Aineta aryballos (a seventh-century BCE Corinthian vase sold to the British Museum in 1866 by the epigrapher and art dealer Athanasios Rousopoulos) and a series of funerary plaques, painted by Exekias, sold illegally to the German archaeologist Gustav Hirschfeld by the art dealer Anastasios Erneris in 1873.

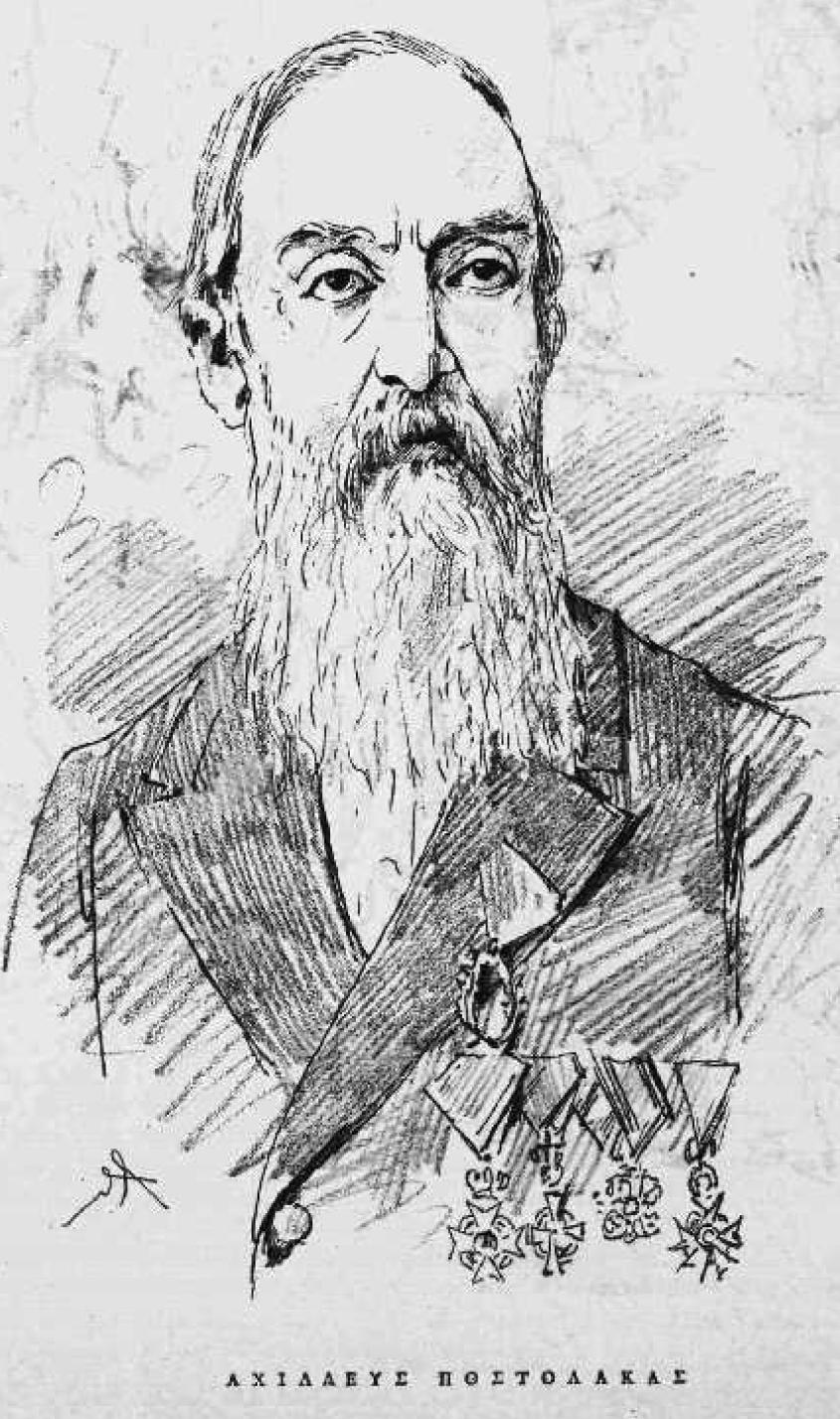
Achilleus Postolakas, drawn in 1888 by Themos Anninos for the satirical newspaper To Asty (Greek: Το Άστυ, lit. 'The City')

Kavvadias has been credited with shaping Law 2646 of 1899, subtitled On Antiquities (Περὶ Ἀρχαιοτήτων). Under the new law, all antiquities ever discovered in Greece, whether on public or private land, were considered property of the state, closing the previous 'joint ownership' loophole. The law was dated 5 August [O.S. 24 July] 1899 and was followed on 23 August [O.S. 11 August] 1899 by a series of six royal decrees, giving the state additional powers to oversee the excavation of antiquities and to prevent their sale overseas. This included the power to confiscate any antiquities not declared to the state within six months of excavation, a total prohibition on unauthorised excavations, and severe legal penalties for those contravening the new law. The law of 1899 also centralised power in the hands of the Ephor General, who was given the final decision over most critical matters. It also, for the first time, formally identified the Byzantine period as part of "Hellenism" – the idea of Greek history and culture – and has been described as part of "the rehabilitation and incorporation of Byzantium ... into the national narrative". Greece's first ephor of Byzantine antiquities, Adamantios Adamantiou, was appointed under Kavvadias in 1908.

Kavvadias was known for his determination to oppose the export of antiquities: Reinach wrote in his obituary of the "fever of confiscations" that Kavvadias launched. However, Reinach also judged that his efforts "produced hardly any useful effects", pointing to an 1886 case in which Kavvadias seized a group of fake terracotta plaques, which were being exported from Athens to Paris wrapped in pages from a journal with only a single subscriber in Athens, a merchant by the name of Lambros. Lambros had influence with King George of Greece, and had a relative who was a tutor to the future King Constantine I; Kavvadias therefore abandoned the case.

In 1887, several items were stolen from the Numismatic Museum of Athens by a thief named Periklis Raftopoulos, who was apprehended by police in Paris. Kavvadias dismissed the founder and director of the museum, Achilleus Postolakas, and accused him of complicity in the theft. Kavvadias also dismissed Ioannis Svoronos, Postolakas's deputy, and attempted to prosecute the French buyers who had attempted to purchase Raftoupoulos's stolen antiquities. One of those buyers killed himself before the French cabinet minister Édouard Lockroy, through his subordinate Gustave Larroumet, made clear to Kavvadias that the French government would not pursue what he considered to be a matter for Greek customs. Postolakas was acquitted by an Athenian court in April 1889, and the affair made Kavvadias several enemies: Reinach later wrote that the Ephor General had "lost his head a little".

== Dismissal, exile and return (1909–1928) ==
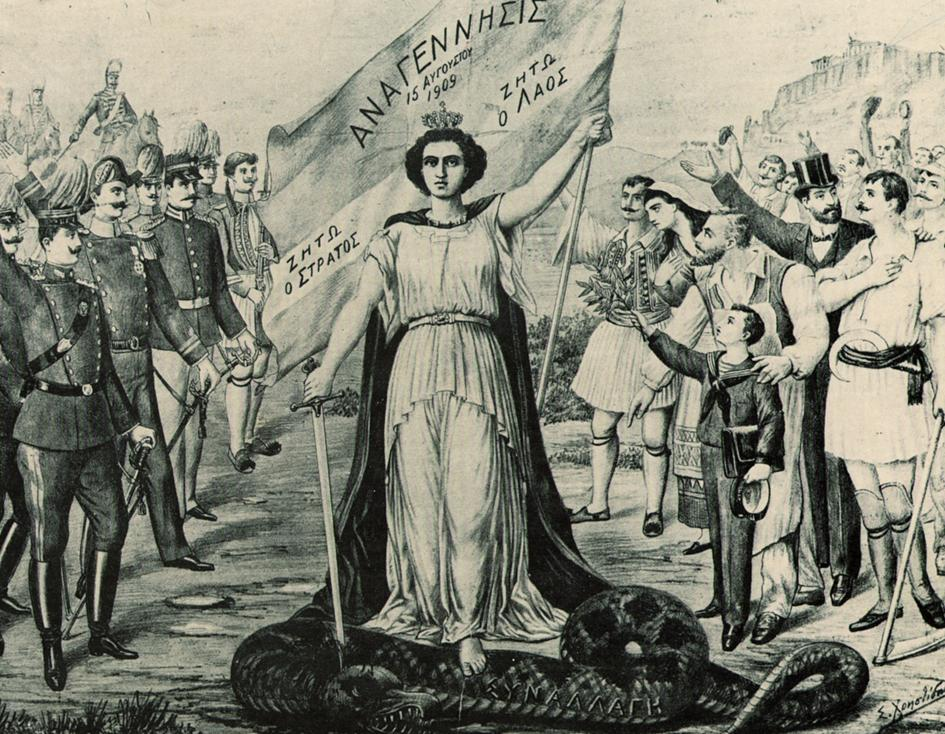
Greek poster of 1909 celebrating the Goudi Coup as a moment of national rebirth

On 10 September [O.S. 28 August] 1909, a group of army officers known as the 'Military League' carried out the Goudi coup, which led to popular demonstrations against the political establishment and the resignation of the prime minister, Dimitrios Rallis. Kavvadias's subordinates launched their own so-called "mutiny of the ephors", angered by his style of leadership, which has since been described as both "authoritarian" and "tyrannical". Another source of opposition to Kavvadias within Greece was his support of the foreign schools of archaeology, which he was accused of privileging above the interests of native Greek archaeologists.

Discontent with Kavvadias reached the Greek press on 22 November [O.S. 9 November] with an article in the newspaper Chronos, considered the mouthpiece of the Military League. Entitled "Need for Honesty" (Ἀνάγκη Εἰλικρινείας), the article accused Kavvadias of "humiliating Greek science for the profit of foreign science" through being overly "accommodating" to the foreign schools, supporting them from Greek resources, and giving them access to the best archaeological sites in preference to Greek archaeologists. Kavvadias's long-time opponent Ioannis Svoronos was accused of being behind the article, though he denied any involvement and expressed his support for the foreign schools. Three days later, the directors of the foreign schools published a joint riposte in the journal Estia, denying the accusations made in Chronos and praising Kavvadias for his "dominant role" in "render[ing] Athens its former prestige as metropolis for ancient studies".

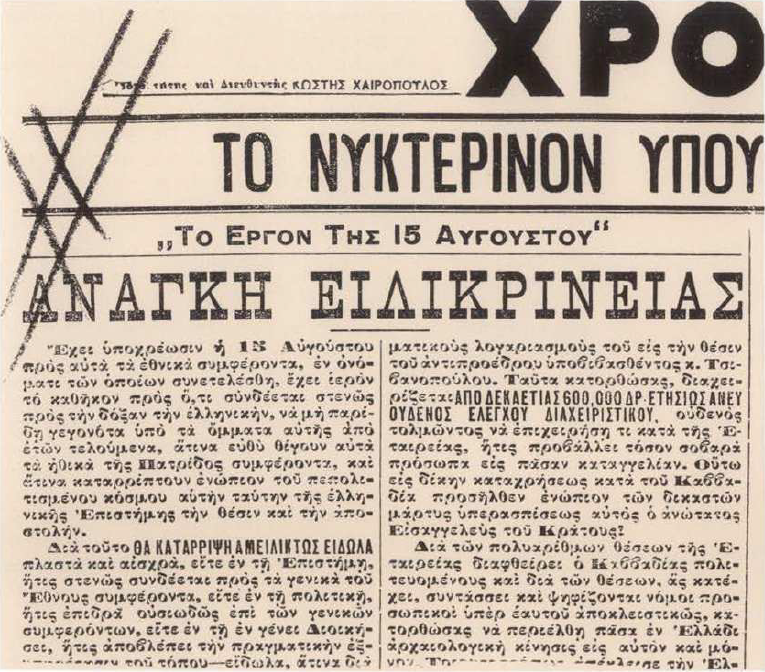
The headline and article in Chronos, published on 22 November [O.S. 9 November] 1909, criticising Kavvadias's management of the Greek Archaeological Service and Archaeological Society of Athens

Nevertheless, criticism of Kavvadias continued to build. On 7 December [O.S. 24 November], Svoronos wrote a letter in Chronos in which he accused Kavvadias of misappropriating 80,000 drachmas from the sale of his museum catalogues, and another journal accused Kavvadias of improperly favouring foreign archaeologists, and criticised the Archaeological Society for its inaction. The Military League called for his resignation, in what the British newspaper The Times called "a policy of proscription". Kavvadias also came under pressure from within the government, and the Minister for Education advised him to step down. He asked the board of the Archaeological Society for temporary leave from his role as secretary, which was granted. Before the end of 1909, he had been removed from his post as Ephor General, and ordered to leave Greece by the Military League, who labelled him "a dangerous reactionary" and had him escorted to the harbour of Piraeus by a military non-commissioned officer. He left for Vienna, and subsequently settled in Paris. His protégé Stais, who had served on the Archaeological Society's council since 1896, was forced to resign at the same time, and in 1910 Kavvadias was stripped of his professorship at the National University of Athens. Kavvadias's downfall was met by protests from many of the foreign schools, who had benefitted from his liberal attitudes towards their activities. In Britain, the university professors Robert Carr Bosanquet, Percy Gardner and Ernest Arthur Gardner organised a collection of funds to support him.

Following Kavvadias's ousting, the Greek government reorganised the Archaeological Service. Kavvadias's duties were given to the archaeologist Gabriel Byzantinos, who was shortly afterwards replaced by Vasileios Leonardos, the director of Athens's Epigraphical Museum. Under Law 3721, dated 13 April [O.S. 31 March] 1910, the General Ephorate was abolished, in favour of a more collective system of management where the function of the Ephor General was assumed by the 'Archaeological Board', a ten-member committee of university professors, ephors and the directors of Athens's museums, on which the newly titled Director of the Archaeological Service (Christos Tsountas) had a single vote. (Note: Petrakos 1982, p. 41. For Tsountas as Kavvadias's successor, see Gill 2011, p. 60.) The country was re-divided into seven archaeological districts, replacing the nine established by Kavvadias in 1886. A further outcome of the reforms was that the Archaeological Society was no longer permitted to conduct restoration work, which now had to be undertaken by the Archaeological Service.

When the National Assembly was elected on 21 August [O.S. 8 August] 1910 – a measure negotiated in exchange for the Military League's disbandment by Eleftherios Venizelos, a Cretan politician invited by the League's leaders to help negotiate a political settlement to the coup – Kavvadias was elected by the people of Kephallonia as their representative. On the dissolution of the Assembly in 1912, Kavvadias regained his post as secretary of the Archaeological Society, and subsequently held it until 1920. He also regained his professorship at Athens, which he would hold until 1922, and became chairman of the Archaeological Board, which he remained until his resignation in 1920. In February 1919, the Greek government asked the Archaeological Society of Athens to re-establish the "Practical School of Art History", an archaeological training centre which had been closed down after commencing small-scale operations in 1894. Kavvadias was appointed as one of its founding professors, alongside Tsountas, Svoronos, Adamantiou, Soteriadis, Kourouniotis, Sokratis Kougeas, Antonios Keramopoulos and Politis, who was elected as the school's director by the other professors. (Note: Petrakos 1995, pp. 120–121. Petrakos gives the school's name in Greek, as Πρακτικῆς Σχολῆς τῆς ἱστορίας τῆς τέχνης.) The school's thirty-six students in its first year included Semni Papaspyridi, Christos Karouzos and Spyridon Marinatos, all of whom went on to become leading figures in twentieth-century Greek archaeology.

In 1920, Kavvadias began work on a corpus of Greek mosaics, funded by the Greek government and the Union Académique Internationale, which remained unfinished at the time of his death. He returned to Epidaurus for the final time in June 1928. There, he suffered a seizure. He returned to Athens, where he died on 20 July.

== Impact upon Greek archaeology ==
=== As an archaeologist ===
In 1910, the journal of the British Classical Association described Kavvadias as a "household name" among archaeologists. His work at Epidaurus was recognised in his lifetime as a crowning achievement: a 1909 American handbook, written while much of Kavvadias's excavations there remained unfinished, described Epidaurus as "one of the most important sites in Greece", and the excavations of the Acropolis under Kavvadias as the most important achievement of the Archaeological Society of Athens. Writing of his work on the Acropolis in the Archaeological Bulletin, Kavvadias boasted to have "deliver[ed] the Acropolis back to the civilised world, cleansed of all barbaric additions, a noble monument to the Greek genius, a modest and unique treasury of superb works of ancient art". (Note: Quoted in Mallouchou-Tufano 1994, p. 80) Within the field of Greek art history, his discovery of red-figure pottery in the debris of the Perserschutt provided a terminus ante quem demonstrating that this style had been in use before 479 BCE, which contradicted the then-current understanding of the chronological relationship between red-figure and black-figure vase painting. For his own part, Kavvadias described the findings of his work on the Acropolis as "most significant, unexpected and awesome". (Note: Quoted in Mallouchou-Tufano 1994, p. 78)

He was also notable in the study of epigraphy, a field of archaeology closely linked with the identity of the nineteenth-century Greek state. In 1906, he was listed in a French academic journal as one of the three "particularly illustrious" epigraphers of his day, alongside Koumanoudis and Konstantinos Karapanos. Nikolaos Papazarkadas, a modern historian of Greek epigraphy, has also praised Kavvadias's work on the inscriptions he uncovered on the Acropolis, as well as the 'miracle inscriptions' from Epidaurus.

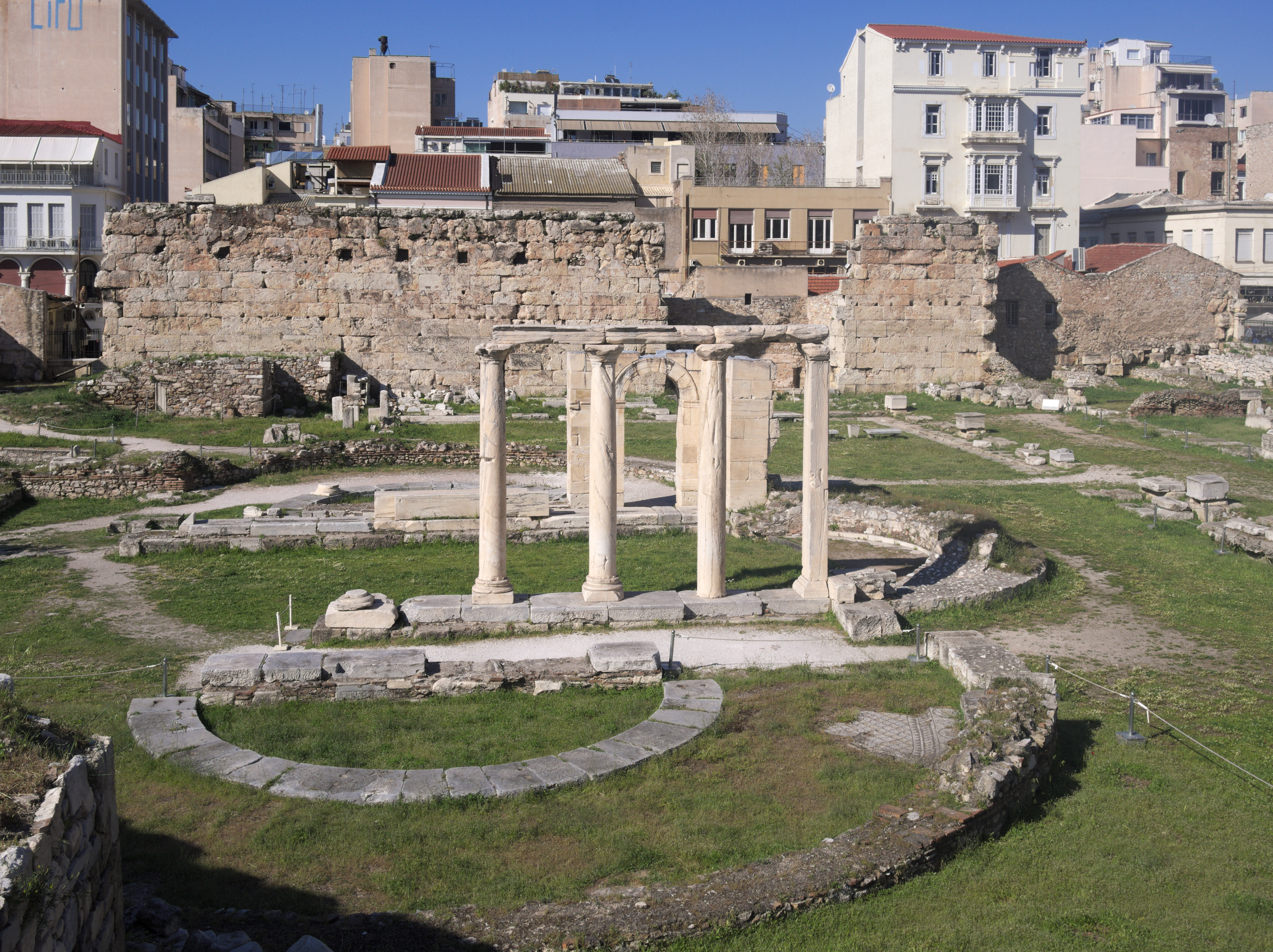
View of Hadrian's Library from the south, excavated between 1885 and 1886

As Ephor General, Kavvadias oversaw other significant archaeological excavations, particularly that of Delphi, which was undertaken between 1892 and 1903 by the French School at Athens as the Archaeological Society lacked the funding for the work. He was also responsible for the recovery and study of the Antikythera mechanism under Valerios Stais from 1900 to 1902. In Athens, Kavvadias's period as Ephor General saw significant excavations beyond the Acropolis: the partial excavation and identification of Hadrian's Library by Koumanoudis between 1885 and 1886, and excavations in the Roman Agora between 1890 and 1891, which involved the expropriation and demolition of several residential, religious and military buildings, including the total removal of Epameinondas Street. According to Mallouchou-Tufano, his excavations, particularly on the Acropolis, provided "a huge impetus, both internationally and in Greece ... to the scientific investigation of the history of the [Acropolis] ... [and to] epigraphy, pottery and the history of ancient art." Although the restorations made under Kavvadias's supervision by Nikolaos Balanos were later criticised and mostly reversed, the vision of the Acropolis and its monuments they created has been termed "the 'trade-mark' of modern Greece".

=== As an archaeological administrator ===
Kavvadias has been termed "a dominant personality" in Greek archaeology around the turn of the 20th century, and his position as a "virtual dictatorship ... in archaeological matters". The rapid expansion of the Archaeological Service between 1883 and 1908, nearly all of which Kavvadias oversaw, has been described as "the beginning of a new era in [its] history". His approach to its organisation has been described as "centralising", and as marked by the energetic way in which he pursued his objectives. Several archaeologists hired as ephors under Kavvadias became significant figures in Greek archaeology: Kourouniotis, for example, would be director of the National Archaeological Museum (from 1922 to 1925) and serve two terms as director of the Archaeological Service (1914–1920 and 1925–1933). As an administrator, Kavvadias has been praised for his archaeological and legal expertise, and the administrative and legal structures he created within the Archaeological Service and through laws and royal decrees have been credited with creating "the shape, in miniature" of the twenty-first century administration of antiquities in Greece. Writing in 1995, Petrakos considered him the most influential of the Archaeological Service's directors.

Kavvadias was recognised for his support of Athens's foreign archaeological institutes, which multiplied in number and activity during his tenure. The British School at Athens was founded in 1886 and the Austrian Archaeological Institute at Athens in 1898; the Italian School of Archaeology at Athens was founded in July 1909, shortly before Kavvadias's removal as Ephor General. He had a particularly warm relationship with Charles Waldstein, director of the American School of Classical Studies at Athens from 1889 until 1893. Thomas Day Seymour, chairman of the school's managing committee, remarked that Kavvadias, whom he usually judged "surly", became "genial" in Waldstein's presence, and suggested that Kavvadias would make Waldstein "a present of the whole Acropolis, if it were in his power". (Note: Quoted in Lee 2022, p. 155.) It was at Waldstein's instigation that Kavvadias issued the American School its permit to excavate at Eretria on Euboea in January 1891. Kavvadias's contemporary Bosanquet wrote that his patronage of the foreign schools was a significant factor in promoting the "study and preservation of his country's heritage". In 2007, Petrakos named the foreign schools, and the excavations, publications and lectures that have taken part under their auspices, as a substantial factor behind making Athens "the major centre of Greek archaeology".

Within the Archaeological Service and the Archaeological Society, Kavvadias's style of leadership – described in modern times as "tyrannical" and a "monocracy" – was unpopular. By the end of his tenure, he had made enemies among the Archaeological Society, among his subordinates and among university-based archaeologists. Petrakos has accused him of "deliberate defamation" in his handling of the Archaeological Society of Athens, and characterised his centralising approach to administration as "suffocating" the ephors who worked under him. In turn, this discontent was a major factor behind Kavvadias's removal under the Military League in 1909.

== Personal life and honours ==
Kavvadias had two sons: Alexander Polycleitos Cawadias, a medical doctor known for his work on intersexuality, and Epameinondas Kavvadias, an admiral in the Hellenic Navy who served as its commander during the Second World War.

Kavvadias was elected an honorary member of the British Society of Antiquaries in 1893, a corresponding member of the French Académie des Inscriptions et Belles-Lettres in 1894, a member of the Royal Academy of Belgium and a corresponding member of the Prussian Academy of Sciences in Berlin. He was also awarded an honorary doctorate by the University of Cambridge in 1904, as well as an honorary professorship at Leipzig University. In 1926, he was elected as a founding member of the Academy of Athens, Greece's national academy. He was also an honorary member of the British Royal Society of Medicine.

== Selected publications ==
- Kavvadias, Panagiotis (1879). Η εν Λούβρω Σαμοθρακία Νίκη και η σπουδαιότης αυτής διά την ιστορίαν της πλαστικής [The Nike of Samothrace in the Louvre and its Importance for the History of Sculpture] (in Greek). Athens: National University of Athens.
- — (1881). Το θέατρο της Επιδαύρου [The Theatre of Epidaurus] (in Greek). Athens.
- — (1891). Fouilles d'Épidaure [Excavations of Epidaurus] (in French). Athens: S.C. Vlastos.
- — (1893a). Fouilles de Lycosoura [Excavations of Lycosoura] (in French). Athens: Impimerie S.C. Vlastos.
- — (1893b). Les Musées d'Athènes [The Museums of Athens] (in French). Athens.
- — (1900). Τὸ Iερὸν τοῦ Ασκληπιοῦ ἐν Ἐπιδαύρῳ καὶ ἡ Θεραπεία τῶν Ἀσθενῶν [The Shrine of Asklepios at Epidauros and the Healing of the Sick] (in Greek). Athens.
- —; Kawerau, Georg (1906). Η ανασκαφή της Ακροπόλεως από του 1885 μέχρι του 1890 [The Excavation of the Acropolis from 1885 to 1890] (in Greek and German). Athens.
- — (1906). Ἱστορία τῆς Ἀρχαιολογικῆς Έταιρείας [History of the Archaeological Society] (in Greek). Athens.
- — (1906). Προϊστορική Αρχαιολογία [Prehistoric Archaeology] (in Greek). Vol. 1. Athens.
- — (1911). Marbres des Musées de Grèce exposés à Rome [Marbles from Museums in Greece Exhibited in Rome] (in French). Athens.
- — (1914). Προϊστορική Αρχαιολογία [Prehistoric Archaeology] (in Greek). Vol. 2. Athens.
- — (1916). Ἱστορία της Ελληνικής Τέχνης [History of Greek Art] (in Greek). Athens.

== Sources ==
- Archaeological Society of Athens (2003). Πρόσωπα της Εταιρείας: Kαββαδίας Παναγιώτης [Faces of the Society: Kavvadias Panagiotis]. Archaeological Society of Athens (in Greek). Archived from the original on 14 March 2012.
- Aslanidis, Klimis (2015). "The Roman Odeion at Epidaurus". Journal of Roman Archaeology. 16: 300–311. doi:10.1017/S104775940001312X. S2CID 164670281.
- Beazley, John; Ashmole, Bernard (2009) [1932]. Greek Sculpture and Painting to the End of the Hellenistic Period. Cambridge University Press. ISBN 0-521-04131-7. OCLC 587726070.
- Berlin-Brandenburgische Akademie der Wissenschaften (2023). "Paul François Foucart". Mitglieder – historisch (in German).
- Bosanquet, Robert Carr (1929). "Obituary Notice: Dr. Panagiotes Kavvadias". The Antiquaries Journal. 9 (1): 46–47. doi:10.1017/S0003581500012786. S2CID 246043687.
- Bounia, Alexandra; Stylianou-Lambert, Theopisti. National Museums in Cyprus: A Story of Heritage and Conflict (PDF). EuNaMus; European National Museums: Identity Politics; the Uses of the Past and the European Citizen; Bologna 28–30 April 2011. Archived from the original (PDF) on 27 January 2022.
- Breytenbach, Cilliers; Tzavella, Elli (2022). Early Christianity in Athens, Attica, and Adjacent Areas: From Paul to Justinian I (1st–6th Cent. AD). Leiden: Brill. ISBN 978-90-04-52459-0.
- Brinkmann, Vinzenz (2011). "The 'Persian Rider' from the Athenian Acropolis: Or, a Reconstruction of the 'Third Generation'". Notes in the History of Art. 30 (3): 12–17. doi:10.1086/sou.30.3.23208556. JSTOR 23208556. S2CID 192998343.
- Broneer, Oscar (1932). "Eros and Aphrodite on the North Slope of the Acropolis in Athens". Hesperia. 1: 31–55. JSTOR 146474.
- Chabert, S. (1906). "Histoire sommaire des études d'épigraphie Grecque en Europe (suite)" [Summary History of the Study of Greek Epigraphy in Europe (Continued)]. Revue Archéologique. 4 (in French). 8: 97–119.
- Chipiez, Charles (1896). "Les édifices d'Épidaure: remarques et observations critiques" [The Buildings of Epidauros: Critical Remarks and Observations]. Revue Archéologique (in French). 28: 38–59. JSTOR 41729622.
- Christodoulou, Georgios (2009). Ο Ν. Γ. Πολίτης και η αρχαιολογία στο Πανεπιστήμιο Αθηνών [N. G. Polites and Archaeology at the University of Athens] (PDF). Mentor (in Greek). 93: 106–107. Archived from the original (PDF) on 22 September 2022.
- Costaki, Leda (2021). "Urban Archaeology: Uncovering the Ancient City". In Neils, Jenifer; Rogers, Dylan K. (eds.). The Cambridge Companion to Ancient Athens (PDF). Cambridge University Press. pp. 462–481. doi:10.1017/9781108614054. ISBN 978-1-108-61405-4. S2CID 243691800.
- Cardete del Olmo, Maria Cruz (2004). Paisajes mentales y religiosos de la frontera suroeste Arcadia: épocas Arcaica y Clásica [Mental and Religious Landscapes of the South-Eastern Border of Arcadia: Archaic and Classical Periods] (PDF) (Ph.D. thesis) (in Spanish). Complutense University of Madrid. Archived from the original (PDF) on 27 October 2022.
- Danesi, Henri (7 April 2018). "Κavvadias, Panagiotis". Comité des travaux historiques et scientifiques (in French). Archived from the original on 14 June 2022.
- de Grummond, Nancy Thomson (2015). Encyclopedia of the History of Classical Archaeology. Abingdon: Routledge. ISBN 978-1-134-26861-0.
- Dignas, Beate (2010). "A Day in the Life of a Greek Sanctuary". In Ogden, Daniel (ed.). A Companion to Greek Religion. Chichester: Wiley. pp. 163–177. ISBN 978-1-4443-3417-3.
- Dimopoulou-Rethemiotaki, Nota (2005). The Archaeological Museum of Herakleion. Athens: John S. Latsis Public Benefit Foundation. ISBN 960-86743-8-7.
- Dyson, Stephen (2016). Ancient Marbles to American Shores: Classical Archaeology in the United States. Philadelphia: University of Pennsylvania Press. ISBN 978-1-5128-0197-2.
- Florou, Vasiliki (2015). "The House at 9 Ploutarchou Street: A Grape Arbor and a Dense Shadow of Beautiful Meanings". In Vogeikoff-Brogan, Natalia; Davis, Jack; Florou, Vasiliki (eds.). Carl Blegen: Personal and Archaeological Narratives. Atlanta: Lockwood Press. pp. 121–146. ISBN 978-1-937040-23-9.
- Fowler, Harold North; Wheeler, James Rignall; Stevens, Gorham Phillips (1909). A Handbook of Greek Archaeology. New York: Biblio and Tannen. OCLC 819357542.
- French School at Athens (31 January 2018) [2016-03-29]. "Delos – A History of the Excavations". French School at Athens. Archived from the original on 5 July 2022.
- Galanakis, Yannis; Skaltsa, Stella (2012). "Tomb Robbers, Art Dealers, and a Dikast's Pinakion from an Athenian Grave". Hesperia. 81 (4): 619–653. doi:10.2972/hesperia.81.4.0619. JSTOR 10.2972/hesperia.81.4.0619. S2CID 163987166.
- Galanakis, Yannis (2011). "An Unpublished Stirrup Jar from Athens and the 1871–2 Private Excavations in the Outer Kerameikos". Annual of the British School at Athens. 106: 167–200. doi:10.1017/S0068245411000074. JSTOR 41721707. S2CID 162544324.
- Gallant, Thomas W. (2015). Edinburgh History of the Greeks, 1768 to 1913. Edinburgh University Press. ISBN 978-0-7486-3607-5.
- Gill, David (2011). Sifting the Soil of Greece: The Early Years of the British School at Athens (1886–1919). Bulletin of the Institute of Classical Studies Supplements. Vol. 111. London: Institute of Classical Studies. ISBN 978-1-905670-32-1. JSTOR 44214938.
- Glotz, Gustave (1928). "Éloge funèbre de M. Panagiotis Cavvadias, correspondant étranger de l'Académie" [Funerary Eulogy for Mr. Panagiotis Cavvadias, Overseas Correspondent of the Academy]. Comptes Rendus des Séances de l'Académie des Inscriptions et Belles-Lettres (in French). 72 (3): 269–273. Archived from the original (PDF) on 22 June 2022 – via Persée.
- Graf, Fritz (2015). "Healing". In Eidinow, Esther; Kindt, Julia (eds.). The Oxford Handbook of Ancient Greek Religion. Oxford University Press. pp. 505–520. ISBN 978-019-105-807-3.
- Grammatikos, Alexander (2018). British Romantic Literature and the Emerging Modern Greek Nation. Palgrave Studies in the Enlightenment, Romanticism and Cultures of Print. Cham: Palgrave Macmillan. doi:10.1007/978-3-319-90440-5. ISBN 978-3-319-90439-9.
- Guzzetti, Andrea (2012). A Walk through the Past: Toward the Study of Archaeological Museums in Italy, Greece, and Israel (PDF) (Ph.D. thesis). Bryn Mawr College. Archived from the original (PDF) on 28 June 2021.
- Hellenic Navy (10 October 2022). Υποναύαρχος Επαμεινώνδας Καββαδίας ΠΝ [Rear Admiral Epameinondas Kavvadias PN] (in Greek). Archived from the original on 11 February 2023.
- Hellner, Nils (2011). "Überlegungen zu achteckigen Stützen in der antiken Griechischen Architektur" [Thoughts on Octagonal Columns in Ancient Greek Architecture]. Revue Archéologique (in German). 52 (2): 227–262. doi:10.3917/arch.112.0227. JSTOR 41420259.
- Hook, Gail Dallas (2015). Protectorate Cyprus: British Imperial Power Before WWI. London: Bloomsbury. ISBN 978-0-85773-897-4.
- Italian School of Archaeology at Athens (2020). "I direttori della Scuola" [The Directors of the School] (in Italian). Archived from the original on 10 August 2022.
- Kalessopoulou, Despina (2021). "The First National Museum of Modern Greece". In Lagogianni-Georgakarakos, Maria; Koutsogiannis, Thodoris (eds.). These Are What We Fought For: Antiquities and the Greek War of Independence. Athens: Archaeological Resources Fund. pp. 314–332. ISBN 978-960-386-441-7.
- Kaloudis, George (2019). Navigating Turbulent Waters: Greek Politics in the Era of Eleftherios Venizelos. London: Lexington Books. ISBN 978-1-4985-8739-6.
- Karadima, Agathi (2020). Coastal Cult: The Case of Drakaina Cave on Kephallonia (PDF) (Ph.D. thesis). Birkbeck, University of London. Archived from the original (PDF) on 31 December 2022.
- Kavvadias, Panagiotis; Kawerau, Georg (1906). Η ανασκαφή της Ακροπόλεως από του 1885 μέχρι του 1890 [The Excavation of the Acropolis from 1885 to 1890] (in Greek and German). Athens: Hestia. Archived from the original on 14 March 2023.
- Kavvadias, Panagiotis (1893). Fouilles d'Épidaure [Excavations of Epidaurus] (in French). Vol. 1. Athens: S. C. Vlastos.
- Kavvadias, Panagiotis (1912). Περὶ τῶν ἐν Κεφαλληνίᾳ ἀνασκαφῶν [On the Excavations in Kephallenia] (PDF). Πρακτικά της εν Αθήναις Αρχαιολογικής Εταιρείας (in Greek): 247–268. Archived from the original (PDF) on 22 September 2022.
- Kiminas, Demetrius (2009). The Ecumenical Patriarchate. San Bernardino: The Borgo Press. ISBN 978-1-4344-5876-6.
- Kokkou, Angeliki (1977). Η μέριμνα για τις αρχαιότητες στην Ελλάδα και τα πρώτα μουσεία [The Care of Antiquities in Greece and the First Museums] (in Greek). Athens: Hermes Press. pp. 199–201. ISBN 960-6878-11-2.
- Konstantinidi-Syvridi, Eleni; Paschalidis, Constantinos (2019). "The Unacknowledged Panayotis Stamatakis and his Invaluable Contribution to the Understanding of Grave Circle A at Mycenae". Archaeological Reports. 65: 111–126. doi:10.1017/S0570608419000061. JSTOR 26867451.
- Konstantinidi-Syvridi, Eleni (2020). "Panagiotis Stamatakis: 'Valuing the Ancient Monuments of Greece as Sacred Wealth...'". In Lagogianni-Georgakarakos, Maria; Koutsogiannis, Thodoris (eds.). These Are What We Fought For: Antiquities and the Greek War of Independence. Athens: Archaeological Resources Fund. pp. 276–289. ISBN 978-960-386-441-7.
- Kountouri, Elena; Masouridi, Stauroula (2013). Ιστορίες επί χάρτου: Μορφές και θέματα της Αρχαιολογίας στην Ελλάδα του 19ου αιώνα [Histories on Paper: Forms and Themes of Archaeology in Nineteenth-Century Greece] (PDF) (in Greek). Athens: Ministry of Culture and Sports. ISBN 978-960-386-138-6. Archived from the original (PDF) on 22 May 2023.
- Kousoulanos, Evangelos, ed. (21 July 1928). Παναγής Καββαδίας [Panagis Kavvadias]. Skrip. No. 9052. p. 1. Archived from the original on 19 April 2023.
- Lambrinou, Lena (2016). "Ancient Ruins and their Preservation: The Case Study of the Parthenon's East Porch". In Miles, Margaret (ed.). A Companion to Greek Architecture. Oxford: Wiley. pp. 526–545. ISBN 978-1-4443-3599-6.
- Lambros, Spyridon P. (17 January 1891). "Heinrich Schliemann". The Athenaeum. No. 3299. pp. 94–95.
- Lee, John W. I. (2022). The First Black Archaeologist: A Life of John Wesley Gilbert. Oxford: Oxford University Press. ISBN 978-0-19-757899-5.
- Mallouchou-Tufano, Fani (1994). "The History of Interventions on the Acropolis". In Economakis, Richard (ed.). Acropolis Restoration: The CCAM Interventions. Athens: Academy Editions. pp. 69–85. ISBN 1-85490-344-6.
- Mallouchou-Tufano, Fani (1998). Η αναστήλωση των αρχαίων μνηµείων στη νεώτερη Eλλάδα, 1834–1939: Το έργο της Εν Αθήναις Αρχαιολογικής Εταιρείας και της Αρχαιολογικής Υπηρεσίας [The Restoration of Ancient Monuments in Modern Greece, 1834–1939: The Work of the Archaeological Society of Athens and the Archaeological Service] (in Greek). Archaeological Society of Athens. ISBN 960-7036-78-6.
- Mallouchou-Tufano, Fani (2007). "The Vicissitudes of the Athenian Acropolis in the Nineteenth Century: From Castle to Monument". In Valavanis, Panos (ed.). Great Moments in Greek Archaeology. Athens: Kapon Press. pp. 36–57. ISBN 978-0-89236-910-2.
- Mania, Ulrich (2018). "Gymnasial Buildings and Sanctuaries: A Contribution to the Formation of the Palaestra and an Interpretation of the So-Called 'Echo Stoa'". In Mania, Ulrich; Trümper, Monika (eds.). Development of Gymnasia and Graeco-Roman Cityscapes (PDF). Berlin: Pro Business Digital Printing. pp. 181–196. ISBN 978-3-9819685-0-7. Archived from the original (PDF) on 2 January 2023.
- Marano, Yuri Alessandro (2019). "'Ours Once More'? Byzantine Archaeology and the Construction of Greek National Identity". In Gelichi, Sauro (ed.). Archeologia Medievale, XLVI, 2019 – Prima dell'Archeologia pubblica. Identità, conflitti sociali e Medioevo nella ricerca del Mediterraneo. Florence: Edizioni all'Insegna del Giglio. pp. 75–96. ISBN 978-88-7814-926-7.
- Marchand, Suzanne L. (2020). Down from Olympus: Archaeology and Philhellenism in Germany, 1750–1970. Princeton University Press. ISBN 978-1-4008-4368-8.
- Mazower, Mark (1992). "The Messiah and the Bourgeoisie: Venizelos and Politics in Greece, 1909–1912". The Historical Journal. 35 (4): 885–904. doi:10.1017/S0018246X00026200. JSTOR 2639443. S2CID 154495315.
- Mertens, Joan R. (2019). "Watercolors of the Acropolis: Émile Gilliéron in Athens" (PDF). Metropolitan Museum of Art Bulletin. ISSN 2325-6915. Archived from the original (PDF) on 27 August 2022.
- Miller, Stephen G. (1992). Excavations at Nemea II: The Early Hellenistic Stadium. Berkeley: University of California Press. ISBN 0-520-21677-6.
- Nagel, Alexander (2022). "Transatlantic Hellas: Archiving Eastern Mediterranean Collections and Materials in the Smithsonian Institution". In Gerry, Thomas M.F. (ed.). Legacies of Ancient Greece in Contemporary Perspectives. Wilmington, Delaware: Vernon Press. pp. 23–64. ISBN 978-1-64889-445-9.
- Neer, Richard (2019). "Three Types of Invisibility: the Acropolis of Athens". In Neer, Richard (ed.). Conditions of Visibility. Oxford University Press. pp. 7–42. ISBN 978-0-19-884556-0.
- Pantos, Pantos A. (2014). "Archaeological Legislation during the 19th Century. From Georg Ludwig von Maurer to Panagiotis Kavvadias".
- Papanikolaou, Alexandros; Zambas, Kostas (October 1987). The Restoration of the Erechthieon (PDF). Athens: Acropolis Monuments Conservation Service.
- Papazarkadas, Nikolaos (2014). "Epigraphy in Early Modern Greece". Journal of the History of Collections. 26 (3): 399–412. doi:10.1093/jhc/fhu018.
- Paschalidis, Constantinos (2020). "Finds that are Intriguing: A Group of Mycenaean Vases and Minor Finds from the Acropolis: Debating the Question of their Provenance and Significance". In Papadimitriou, Nikolas; Wright, James C.; Fachard, Sylvian; Polychronakou-Sgouritsa, Naya; Andrikou, Eleni (eds.). Athens and Attica in Prehistory: Proceedings of the International Conference, Athens, 27–31 May 2015. Oxford: Archaeopress. pp. 529–540. ISBN 978-1-78969-672-1.
- Petrakos, Vasileios (1982). Δοκίµιο για την αρχαιολογική νοµοθεσία [Essay on Archaeological Legislation] (in Greek). Athens: Archaeological Resources and Expropriations Fund (Ταμείο Αρχαιολογικών Πόρων και Απαλλοτριώσεων).
- Petrakos, Vasileios (1987). H Εν Aθήναις Aρχαιολογική Eταιρεία: H ιστορία των 150 χρόνων της [The Archaeological Society of Athens: The History of its 150 Years] (in Greek). Archaeological Society of Athens. OL 47766951M.
- Petrakos, Vasileios (1995). Η Περιπέτεια της ελληνικής αρχαιολογίας στον βίο του Χρήστου Καρούζου [The Adventure of Greek Archaeology in the Life of Christos Karouzos] (PDF) (in Greek). Archaeological Society of Athens. ISBN 960-7036-47-6. Archived from the original (PDF) on 15 October 2021.
- Petrakos, Vasileios (2003). Ἡ κρίση τοῦ 1894 στὴν Ἑταιρεία [The Crisis of 1894 in the Society] (PDF). Mentor (in Greek). 66 (2): 25–48. Archived from the original (PDF) on 9 January 2022.
- Petrakos, Vasileios (2007). "The Stages of Greek Archaeology". In Valavanis, Panos (ed.). Great Moments in Greek Archaeology. Athens: Kapon Press. pp. 16–35. ISBN 978-0-89236-910-2.
- Petrakos, Vasileios (2011). Η Εν Αθήναις Αρχαιολογική Εταιρεία: οι αρχαιολόγοι και οι ανασκαφές 1837–2011 (κατάλογος εκθέσεως) [The Archaeological Society of Athens: The Archaeologists and the Excavations 1837–2011 (Exhibition Catalogue)]. Archaeological Society of Athens. ISBN 978-960-8145-86-3.
- Pierce, Nadine (2006). The Archaeology of Sacred Caves in Attica, Greece (PDF) (M.A.). McMaster University. Archived from the original (PDF) on 31 May 2022.
- Pollitt, Jerome J. (1999). "Introduction: Masters and Masterworks in the Study of Classical Sculpture". Personal Styles in Greek Sculpture. Cambridge University Press. pp. 1–15. ISBN 0-521-65738-5.
- "Professor Panagie Cawadias". The British Medical Journal. 2 (3531): 131. 1928. JSTOR 25329941.
- Reinach, Salomon (1926). "Paul Foucart". Révue Archéologique. 5 (in French). 24: 67–73. JSTOR 41032148.
- Reinach, Salomon (1928). "Panagiotis Kavvadias". Révue Archéologique. 5 (in French). 28: 128–130. JSTOR 23910488.
- Rigsby, Kent J. (2010). "Apollo and the Archons". In Reger, Gary; Ryan, F.X.; Winters, Timothy F. (eds.). Studies in Greek Epigraphy in Honor of Stephen V. Tracy (PDF). Paris: Diffusion de Boccard. pp. 171–176. ISBN 978-2-35613-018-1. Archived from the original (PDF) on 2 January 2023.
- Ross, Shawn (2009). "Homer as History: Greeks and Others in a Dark Age". In Myrsiades, Kostas (ed.). Reading Homer: Film and Text. Vancouver: Fairleigh Dickinson University Press. pp. 21–57. ISBN 978-083-864-219-1.
- Rous, Sarah A. (2019). Reset in Stone: Memory and Reuse in Ancient Athens. Madison, Wisconsin: University of Wisconsin Press. ISBN 978-0-299-32280-9.
- Rosenzweig, Rachel (2004). Worshipping Aphrodite: Art and Cult in Classical Athens. Ann Arbor: University of Michigan Press. ISBN 0-472-11332-1.
- Shear, Ione Mylonas (1999). "The Western Approach to the Athenian Akropolis". Journal of Hellenic Studies. 119: 86–127. doi:10.2307/632313. JSTOR 632313. S2CID 162193867.
- Sineux, Pierre (2011). "La guérison dans les sanctuaires du monde Grec Antique: de Meibom aux Edelstein, remarques historiographiques" [Healing in the Sanctuaries of the Ancient Greek World: from Meibom to Edelstein, Historiographical Remarks]. Anabases (in French). 13 (13): 11–35. doi:10.4000/anabases.1713. Archived from the original on 19 February 2023.
- Stubbs, John H.; Makaš, Emily G. (2011). Architectural Conservation in Europe and the Americas. Hoboken: Wiley. ISBN 978-0-47090-111-3.
- Swenson, Astrid (2013). The Rise of Heritage: Preserving the Past in France, Germany and England, 1789–1914. Cambridge University Press. doi:10.1017/CBO9781139026574. ISBN 978-1-107-46911-2.
- Themelis, Petros (1999). "Damophon". In Palagia, Olga; Pollitt, Jerome J. (eds.). Personal Styles in Greek Sculpture. Cambridge University Press. pp. 154–185. ISBN 978-0-521-65738-9.
- Theodoropoulou-Polychroniadis, Zetta (2015). Sounion Revisited: The Sanctuaries of Poseidon and Athena at Sounion in Attica. Oxford: Archaeopress. ISBN 978-1-78491-155-3.
- Tomlinson, Richard Allan (1983). Epidauros. London: Granada. ISBN 0-292-72044-0.
- Traill, David (2012). "Schliemann's Mycenae Excavations Through the Eyes of Stamatakis" (PDF). In Korres, George Styl; Karadimas, Nektarios; Flouda, George (eds.). Archaeology and Heinrich Schliemann. A Century after his Death. Αssessments and Prospects. Myth – History – Science. Athens: G. S. Korres. pp. 79–84. ISBN 978-960-93-3929-2.
- Trimmis, Konstantinos (2016). "The Forgotten Pioneer: Valerios Stais and his Research in Kythera, Antikythera and Thessaly". Bulletin of the History of Archaeology. 26 (1): 1–10. doi:10.5334/bha-558. hdl:1983/01500056-c564-4c31-b1b6-0d1f0bf037f5.
- Tsouli, Chrysanthi (2020). "Kyriakos Pittakis: Sincere Patriot, Unwearied Guard and Vigilant Εphor of Αntiquities". In Lagogianni-Georgakarakos, Maria; Koutsogiannis, Thodoris (eds.). These Are What We Fought For: Antiquities and the Greek War of Independence. Athens: Archaeological Resources Fund. pp. 266–275. ISBN 978-960-386-441-7.
- Tsouli, Chrysanthi (2021). "Panorama of Personalities". National Archaeological Museum of Athens. Archived from the original on 21 December 2022.
- Villing, Alexandra (2005). Classical Athens. London: British Museum Press. ISBN 0-7141-2792-2.
- Voutsaki, Sofia (2003). "Archaeology and the Construction of the Past in Nineteenth-Century Greece". In Hokwerda, Hero (ed.). Constructions of the Greek Past: Identity and Historical Consciousness from Antiquity to the Present. Groningen: Egbert Forsten. pp. 231–255. ISBN 90-04-49546-0.
- Walters, W. C. F. (1910). "Archaeological Notes". The Classical Review. 24 (8): 262–263. doi:10.1017/S0009840X0004587X. JSTOR 695040. S2CID 246878421.
- Whitley, James (2001). The Archaeology of Ancient Greece. Cambridge University Press. ISBN 0-521-62205-0.
- Whitling, Frederick (2019). Western Ways: Foreign Schools in Rome and Athens. Boston: De Gruyter. ISBN 978-3-11-060158-9.
- Wroth, Warwick (1884). "The Miracles of Aesculapius". The Antiquary. 10: 259–263.

Preceded by Panagiotis Stamatakis	Ephor General of Antiquities; 1885–1909	Office abolished
