= Georg Kawerau =

German architect and archaeologist (1856–1909)

Georg Ferdinand Kawerau
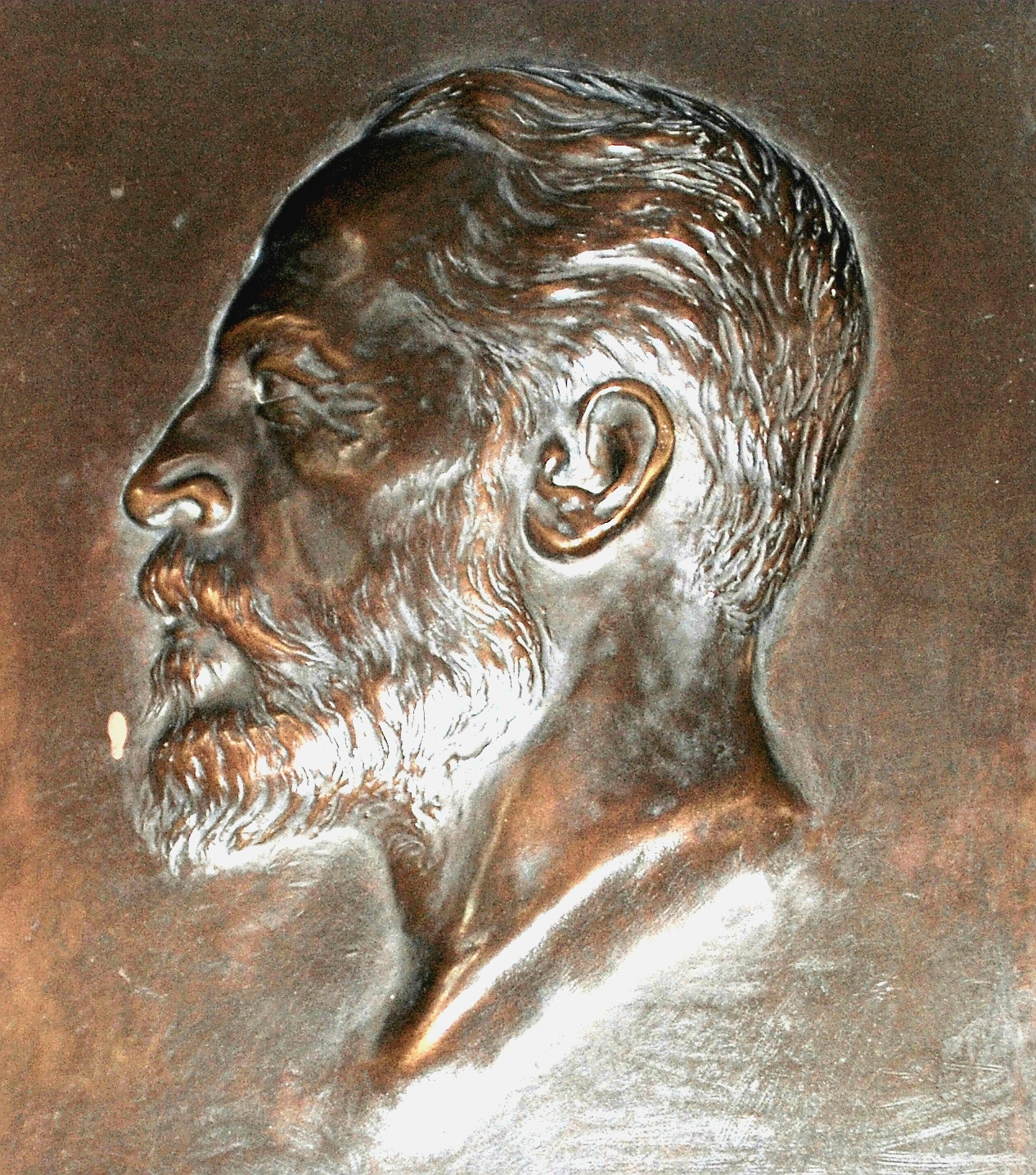
- Commemorative plaque in the library of the German Archaeological Institute at Athens
- Born: December 12, 1856; Berlin
- Died: April 13, 1909 (aged 52); Stettin
- Occupations: Architect, archaeologist

Georg Ferdinand Kawerau (12 December 1856 – 13 April 1909) was a German architect and archaeologist. His archaeological work included the excavations at Tiryns, surveys and excavations on the Acropolis of Athens, and later work at Miletus and Pergamon.

== Life ==
Kawerau was a son of sports educator and church musician Martin Kawerau and his wife Emilie. He grew up in Berlin, attended the Friedrich-Wilhelms-Gymnasium and subsequently studied architecture at the Bauakademie in Berlin. He later worked as a Regierungsbauführer in the garrison construction administration at Stargard.

After a health condition prompted a change of climate, Kawerau went to Greece and became involved in archaeological fieldwork. In 1885 he assisted Heinrich Schliemann at the excavations of Tiryns. From 1885 to 1890 he worked on the Acropolis of Athens for the Greek Archaeological Society under Panagiotis Kavvadias, where his responsibilities included surveying and architectural documentation. He also carried out technical work for the society and participated in restoration work at Olympia, including the re-erection of columns of the Heraion of Olympia.

Kawerau later returned to architectural work in the Ottoman Empire, where his projects included waterworks and work for the Anatolian Railway. In the 1890s he worked on railway buildings on the line between Eskişehir and Konya. He subsequently worked as a private architect in Stettin with the architect Wechselmann.

From the early 1900s Kawerau again became involved in archaeological projects. Alexander Conze brought him into work at Pergamon, while Theodor Wiegand employed him in the excavations at Miletus. In August 1907 the University of Giessen awarded him an honorary doctorate. From 1 April 1908 he served as a directorial assistant of the Berlin Museums, based in Constantinople.

Among Kawerau's later archaeological publications were studies of the Delphinion at Miletus, produced with Albert Rehm, and the palaces of Pergamon, produced with Theodor Wiegand.

== Publications ==
- With Panagiotis Kavvadias: Die Ausgrabung der Akropolis vom Jahre 1885 bis zum Jahre 1890. = Η ανασκαφή της Ακροπόλεως από του 1885 μέχρι του 1890 (= Βιβλιοθήκη της εν Αθήναις Αρχαιολογικής Εταιρείας. 13). Typographeion Hestia, Athens 1906. (Digital copy)
- With Georgios Soteriades: Der Apollotempel zu Thermos. In: Antike Denkmäler, Volume 2, 1902/08. (Digital copy)
- Gedichte. Berlin 1913. Published posthumously, with a foreword by Theodor Wiegand.
- With Albert Rehm: Das Delphinion in Milet (= Milet, Volume 1, 3). Berlin 1914. (Digital copy)
- With Theodor Wiegand: Die Paläste der Hochburg (= Altertümer von Pergamon, Volume 5, 1). Berlin 1930. (Digital copy)
