= Persian Rider =

Ancient sculpture in Acropolis of Athens

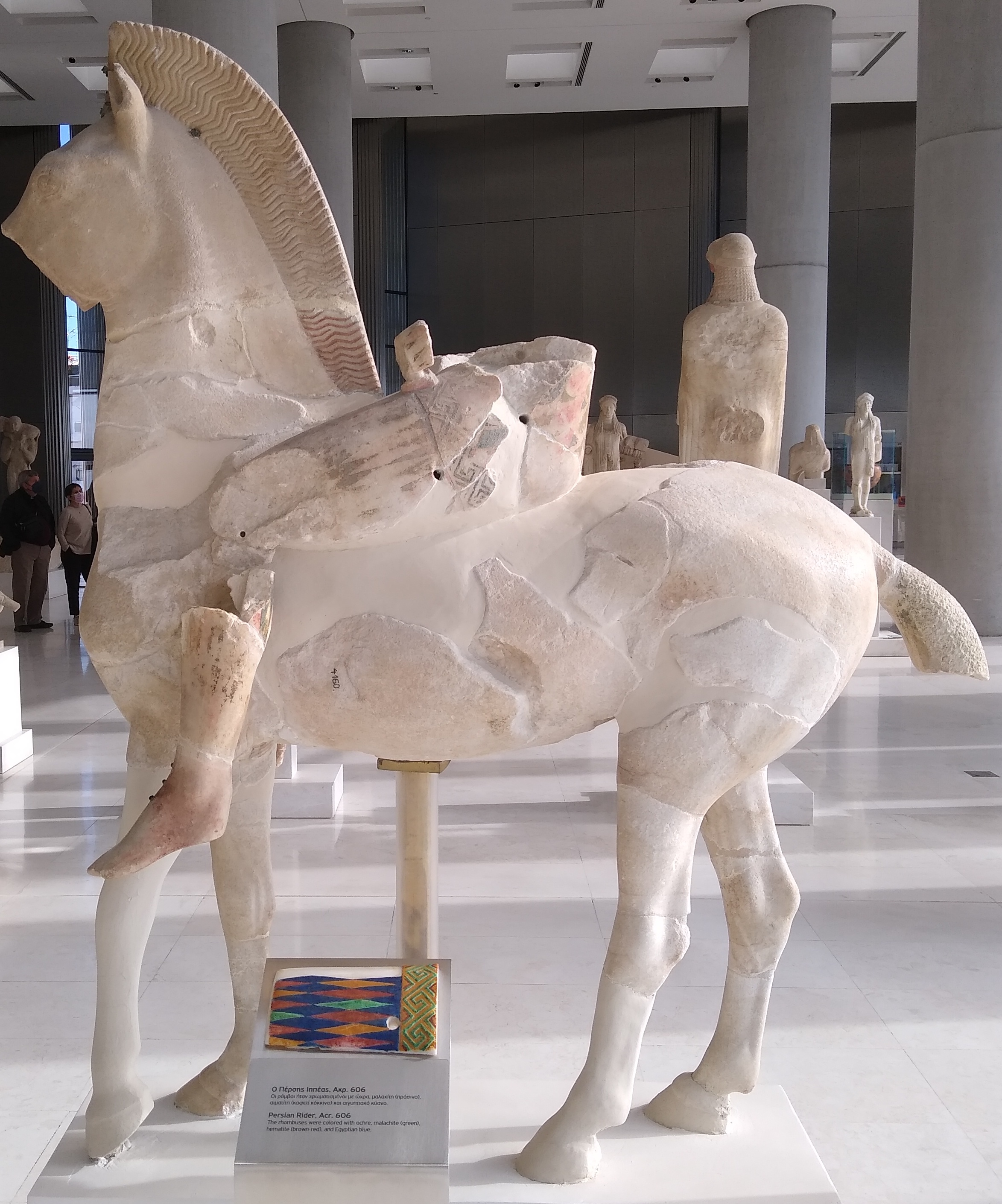
- The Persian Rider at the Acropolis Museum
- Type: Equestrian statue
- Created: c. 520–500 BC
- Discovered: 1886; Acropolis of Athens, Attica, Greece
- Place: Acropolis Museum, Athens
- Culture: Archaic Greece

The Persian Rider is an archaic Greek equestrian sculpture, c. 520–500 BCE, that once stood on the Acropolis of Athens. Only fragmentary remains survive; the lower torso and legs of the rider and the head, forelegs and chest of the horse. It was found west of the Erechtheion in 1886 and reconstructed by Franz Studniczka. Significant amounts of the original surface painting remains on the statue including the multicoloured pattern on the leggings of the rider which is thought to indicate that he was Persian or Scythian, hence the name. The sculpture now stands in the Acropolis Museum.

== Description ==
The rider sits far forward on the horse's shoulders with knees pressed against the horse's neck. A dowel hole at the rider's left hip suggests that his arm may have been attached there from elbow to wrist. The rider wears an elaborate costume of short chiton, anaxyrides or leggings and boots with much detail painted on. A fragmentary remain of the arm indicated he wore a long-sleeved shirt or jacket. An unpainted area about the waist could suggest he also had a bronze belt. The leggings are painted in a trapezoidal pattern in similar colours to the chiton. His ankle-length boots are painted red. The horse has a hogged mane carved with zig-zag grooves that were painted in green and red. The horse's forelock would have been rendered with bronze strips and there is a dowel for what would probably have been a meniskos.

There is some considerable speculation whether the statue has a relationship to the career of Miltiades, the Greek general instrumental in defeating the Persians at Marathon. The evidence for the connection revolves around a red-figure plate by the Cerberus Painter, which also depicts a Persian, Scythian or Thracian archer on horseback dressed in a way similar to the Persian Rider. The plate bears a kalos inscription referring to Miltiades. Wade-Gery suggests that the plate is a replica of the statue. If or how the plate is related to Miltiades, or the plate to the statue, remains an open question. The rider's presence on the Acropolis, a site of elite display and competition, might imply Peisistratid Greek interest in the Achaemenid Empire and its cavalry before Athens developed its own cavalry.

== Bibliography ==
- Eaverly, Mary Ann (1995). Archaic Greek Equestrian Sculpture. University of Michigan Press. ISBN 9780472103515.
- Brinkmann, Vinzenz (2011). "The "Persian Rider" from the Athenian Acropolis; or, a Reconstruction of the "Third Generation"". Notes in the History of Art. 30 (3): 12–17. doi:10.1086/sou.30.3.23208556. S2CID 192998343.
- Payne, H.; Young, G. M. (1936). Archaic Marble sculpture from the Acropolis. London.
- Dickins, Guy (1912). Catalogue Of The Acropolis Museum, Volume I, Archaic Sculpture.
- Markman, S. D. (1943). The Horse in Greek Art.
