= Gabriel Welter =

German archaeologist (1890–1954)

Franz Gabriel Welter (16 May 1890 – 2 August 1954) was a German archaeologist.

== Biography ==
Welter was born in Metz. While still in his early teens, he performed archaeological investigations in the Alsace. He studied under Franz Winter at the University of Strasbourg and at Leipzig University with Franz Studniczka. Later on, he was associated with the German Archaeological Institute, and conducted archaeological excavations on the islands of Aegina and Naxos. On Aegina, he is remembered for his work at Kolonna and at the Temple of Aphaea. At Shechem he is known for destroying the ancient artefacts that were dug up, such as the pillar mentioned in the book of Joshua - https://www.youtube.com/watch?v=mnis257Rd3E . Additionally, he performed archaeological studies in Palestine, publishing Stand der Ausgrabungen in Sichem (1932) as a result. He died in Athens, aged 64.

== Published works ==
- Aus der Karlsruher Vasensammlung, 1922 – On the Karlsruhe collection of vases.
- Stand der Ausgrabungen in Sichem, 1932 – About the excavations at Shechem.
- Aigina, 1938 – Aegina.
- Troizen und Kalaureia, 1941 – Troizen and Kalaureia.
- Chalkis, 1955 – Chalkis.
