= Nikolaos Balanos =

Greek engineer and architect (1869–1943)

- Νικόλαος Μπαλάνος
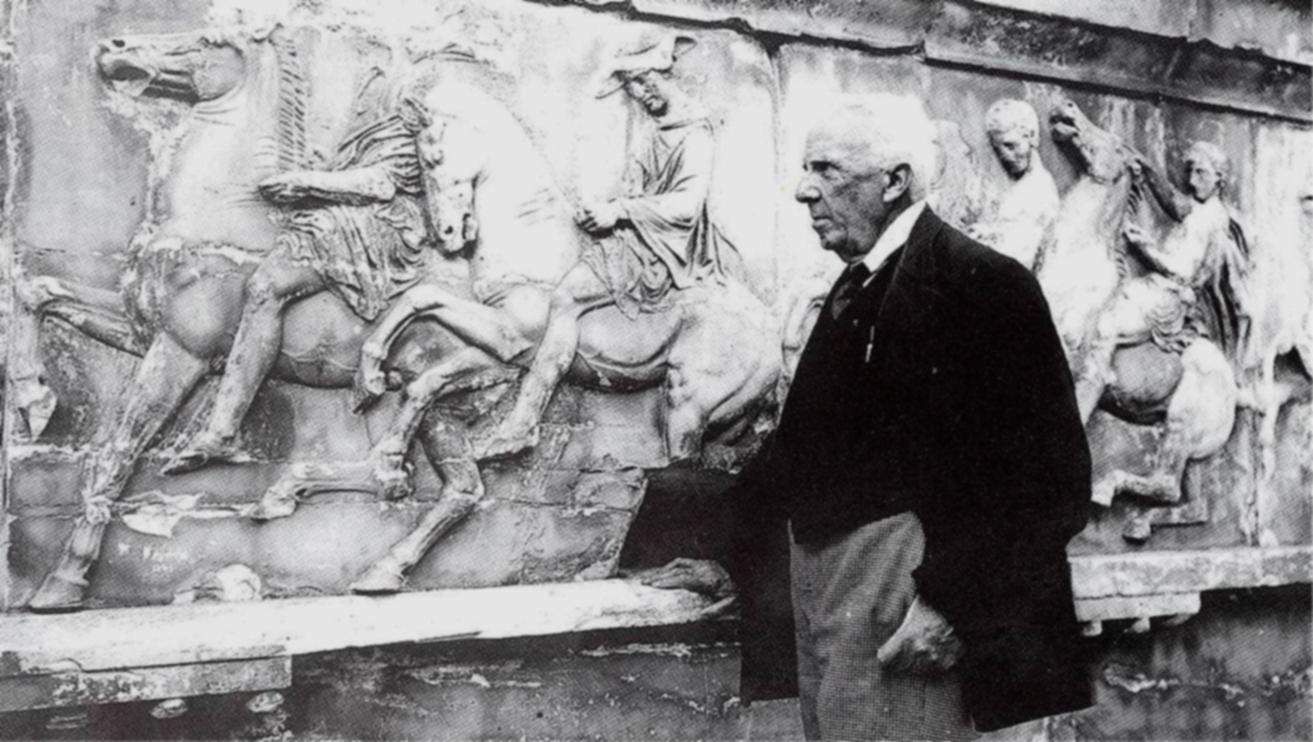
- Nikolaos Balanos in the front of the Parthenon frieze.
- Born: 1869; Athens, Greece
- Died: 22 September 1943 (aged 73–74)
- Education: École Nationale des Ponts et Chaussées, Paris
- Occupation: Architect
- Known for: Restorations of the Acropolis of Athens

Nikolaos Balanos (Greek: Νικόλαος Μπαλάνος; 1869 – 22 September 1943) was a Greek architect. He is best known for his controversial anastylosis (restoration) of monuments on the Acropolis of Athens between 1894 and 1939.

== Biography ==
After studying at the École Nationale des Ponts et Chaussées in Paris, he became Director of the Technical Department of the Greek Ministry of Public Instruction.

In 1932, at the 350th anniversary of the University of Würzburg, he was named Doctor honoris causa of the Faculty of Arts.

== Work on the Acropolis of Athens ==
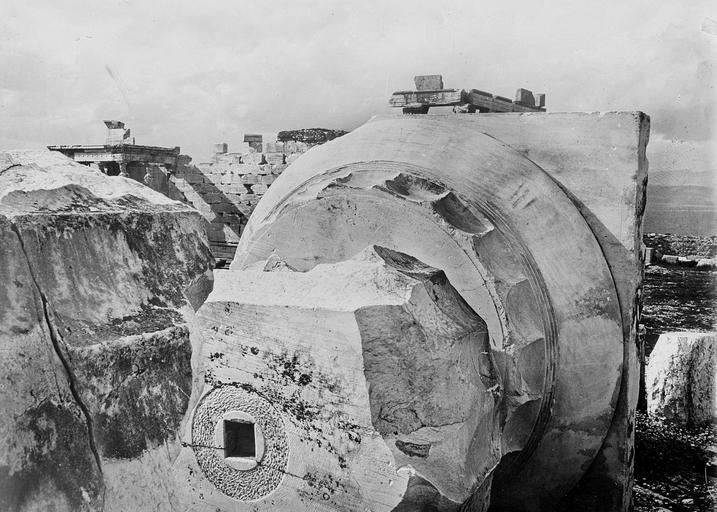
A capital of the Parthenon lying on its side in 1899

In 1894, Balanos was given responsibility for the restoration of the Parthenon, which had been damaged in earthquakes over the previous year. The supervising committee appointed by the Greek Archaeological Service to oversee the work had decided to make a partial reconstruction of the temple, which would strengthen the damaged parts and replace, where necessary, ancient marble with modern. They also decided to use, as far as possible, the original building methods — specifically, dry-stone masonry held together with metal clamps — in the restoration work.

The restorations were notionally supervised by the English, German and French architects Francis Penrose, Josef Durm and Lucien Magne, but the operational direction was delegated to the 'Committee for the Conservation of the Parthenon', a body which included academics, members of Athens' foreign schools of archaeology, and representatives of the Greek government. Nikolaos Balanos, Athens' Chief Engineer of Public Works, was invited to join this committee after its formation, and effectively took control of the reconstructions, operating, according to the archaeological historian Fani Mallouchou-Tufano, "independently and unchecked".

The first phase of the practical work of restoration took place between 1898 and 1902, replacing parts of the upper columns in the Parthenon's opisthodomos and west façade as well as most of the structural blocks behind the west frieze. Balanos also disassembled, repaired and reinforced several parts of the temple, particularly its pediments.

By 1900, Balanos had also restored one of the twelve marble sections of the roof of the Propylaia. Between 1902 and 1909, he restored the Erechtheion, using a combination of original and new material: he rebuilt the ceilings of the north and south porches, as well as large parts of the south, west and north walls.

Balanos' final restorations were of the Temple of Athena Nike, which he began in 1935. The temple had originally been reconstructed under Ludwig Ross and Kyriakos Pittakis between 1835 and 1847, but sudden subsidence under its crepidoma had left it in danger of collapse. Balanos dismantled the temple, and rebuilt it up to the orthostates, making a tentative restoration of the upper parts of the temple which was later completed by Anastasios Orlandos in 1940. Along with the German archaeologist Gabriel Welter, Balanos excavated the tower on which the temple was built, as part of which he found remains of the Mycenaean fortifications of the acropolis as well as traces of the worship of Athena from the Archaic period. In 1939, Balanos' own ill health and the approach of the Second World War forced him to abandon the project.

Balanos' use of the term has been credited for the international recognition of the word anastylosis to refer to reconstructing monuments with the use of original fragments.

== Criticism ==
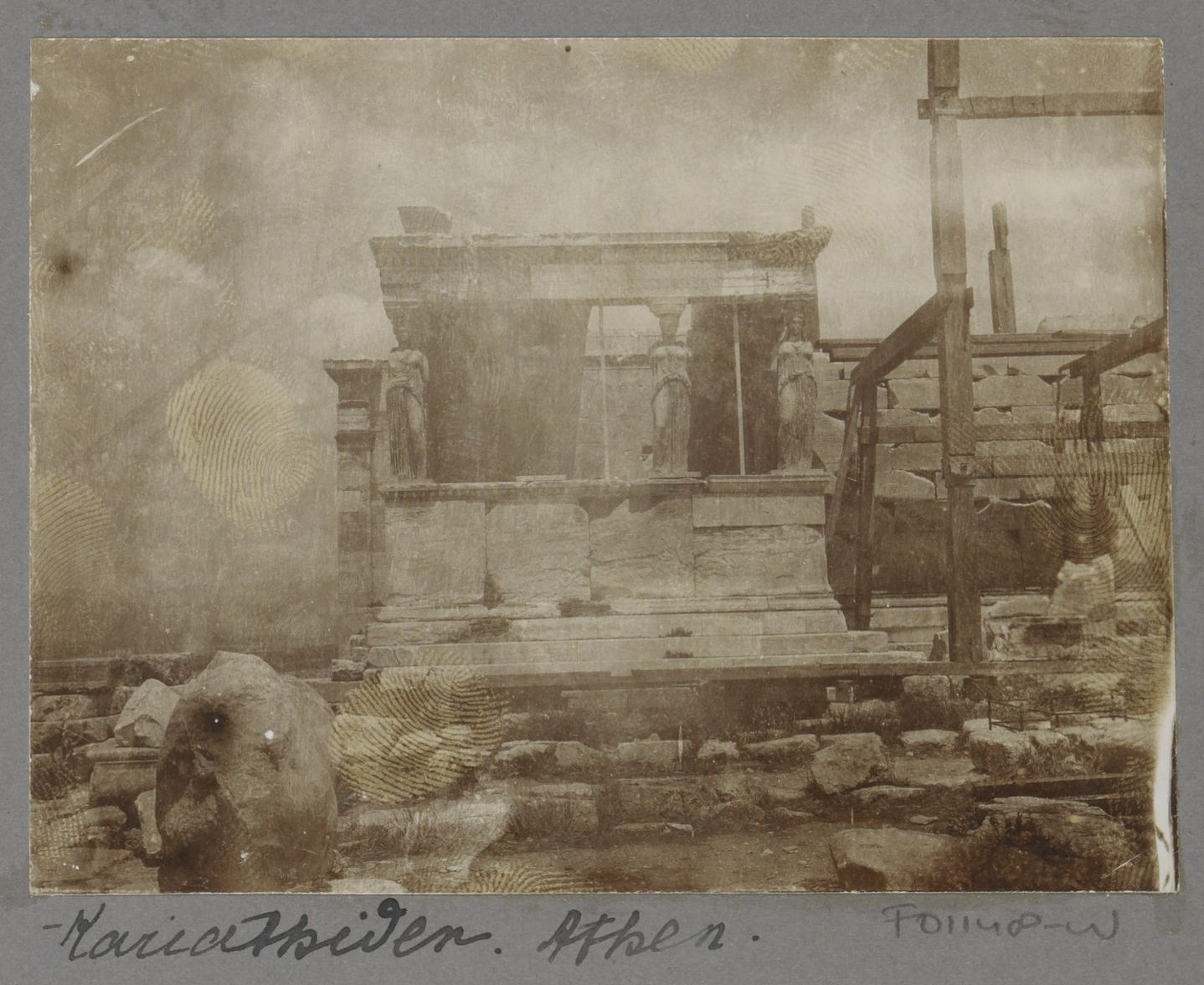
The Erechtheion in 1905, with Balanos' scaffolding visible.

Balanos' work was initially praised by his contemporaries. More recently, however, it has been criticised for its "invasive" methodology and for the lack of archaeological expertise shown in some of the restorations: Balanos himself had no formal archaeological training. He has also been criticised for prioritising aesthetic concerns over the historical integrity of the monument, sometimes sawing pieces off two different ancient blocks so that they could be joined into a new one.

In Ancient Greece, iron clamps were used to hold together pieces of masonry, and were shielded with lead to protect them from water. Balanos, however, did not use lead in his restorations, instead surrounding the clamps with reinforced concrete, which he believed would be waterproof. This was not, however, the case, and water was able to enter the structures, causing the iron to rust and expand, cracking the marble and causing blocks to fall apart. The damage caused to the monuments in this way has been described as "irreparable".

As with the Parthenon, severe problems with his reconstructions of the Erectheion became apparent by the mid-20th century. A particular problem was the exposure of the original Caryatids to air pollution, which was causing corrosion. In 1977, a major programme of dismantling and repair was announced, which included the removal of the Caryatids to the Acropolis Museum and their replacement on the temple by replicas.

From the 1980s onwards, a second restoration campaign attempted to correct the errors previously committed by Balanos. The drums and capitals of the Parthenon's 46 columns were returned to their original positions and his iron clamps were replaced with titanium. This work, led by the Greek architect Emmanouil Korres, included the total dismantling and re-working of Balanos' restoration of the Parthenon's north colonnade in 2001. Initially planned to run until 1990, the restorations were still ongoing as of April 2021.

== Works ==
- The Anastylosis on the North Colonnade of the Parthenon (1936) (Greek: Η αναστήλωση της βόρειας κιονοστοιχίας του Παρθενώνα)
- The Erechtheum (1927)
- The Monuments of the Acropolis, documentation and conservation (1928), (Greek: Τα μνημεία της Ακροπόλεως, αποτύπωση και συντήρηση)

== Bibliography ==
- Bouras, Charalambos (2012). "Thirty-five years of restoration of the Acropolis monuments". In Bouras, Charalambos; Ioannidou, Maria; Jenkins, Ian (eds.). Acropolis Restored. London: British Museum Press. pp. 1–10. ISBN 9780861591879.
- Chaddha, Rima (18 August 2015). "Secrets of the Parthenon". www.pbs.org. PBS. Archived from the original on 2023-02-11.
- Lambrinou, Lena (2016). "Ancient Ruins and Their Preservation: The Case Study of the Parthenon's East Porch". In Miles, Margaret (ed.). A Companion to Greek Architecture. Oxford: Wiley. pp. 526–545. ISBN 9781444335996.
- Lambrinou, Lena (2012). "The Parthenon North Side". In Bouras, Charalambos; Ioannidou, Maria; Jenkins, Ian (eds.). Acropolis Restored. London: British Museum Press. pp. 49–56. ISBN 9780861591879.
- Mallouchou-Tufano, Fani (1994). "The History of Interventions on the Acropolis". In Economakis, Richard (ed.). Acropolis Restoration: The CCAM Interventions. Athens: Academy Editions. pp. 69–85. ISBN 9781854903440.
- McGreevy, Nora (2021-04-29). "Why Proposed Renovations to Greece's Acropolis Are So Controversial". Smithsonian Magazine. Archived from the original on 2023-02-11.
- Papanikolaou, Alexandros; Zambas, Kostas (1987). The Restoration of the Erechthieon (PDF). Athens.
