= Adriaan Goekoop =

Dutch architect and amateur archaeologist

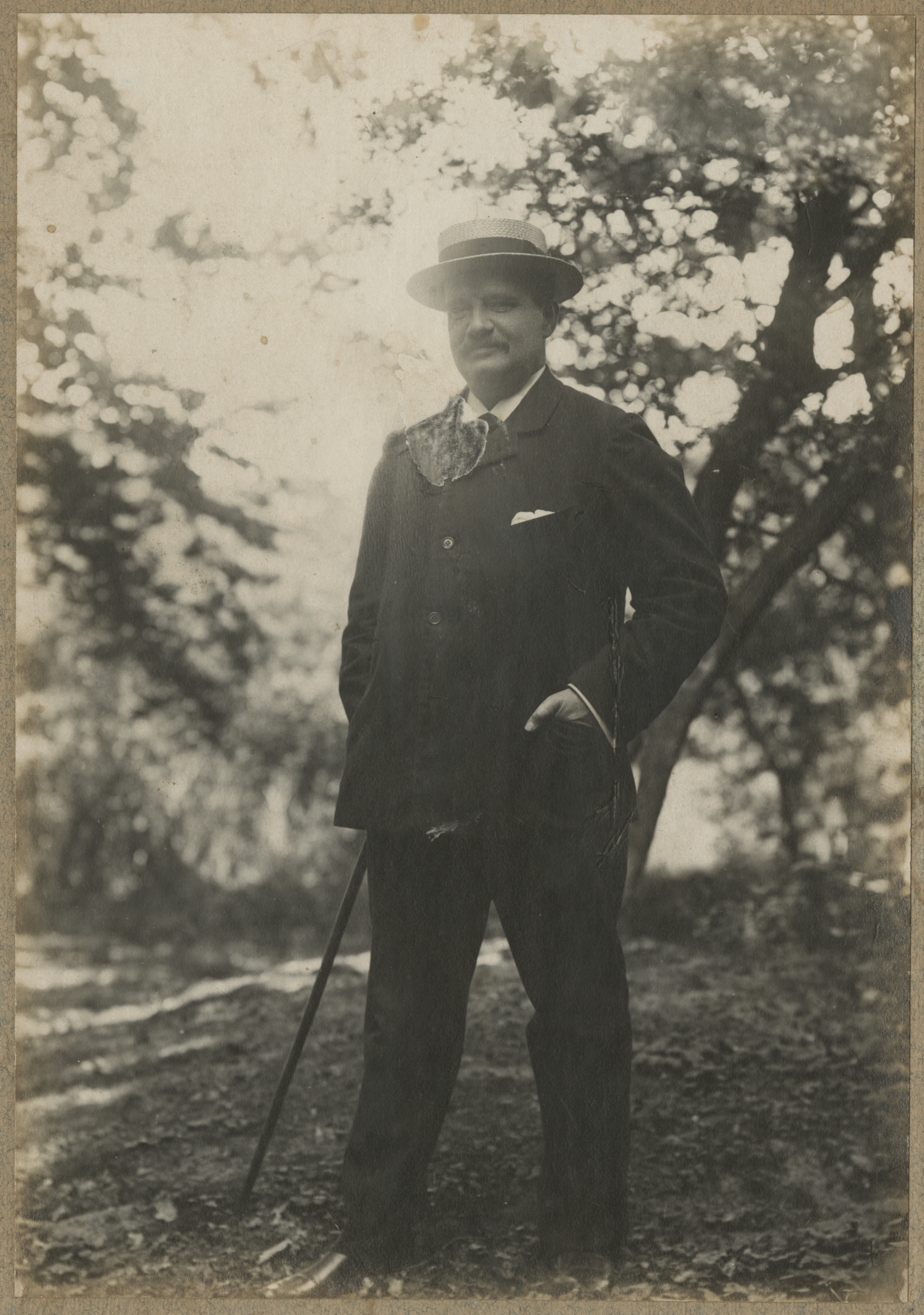
- Born: Adriaan Eliza Herman Goekoop; 28 April 1859; Goedereede
- Died: 24 September 1914 (aged 55); The Hague
- Occupation: Architect
- Spouse: Johanna Goekoop-de Jongh

Adriaan Eliza Herman Goekoop (born 28 April 1859 in Goedereede; died 24 September 1914 in The Hague) was an architect and amateur archaeologist from The Hague.

== Childhood ==
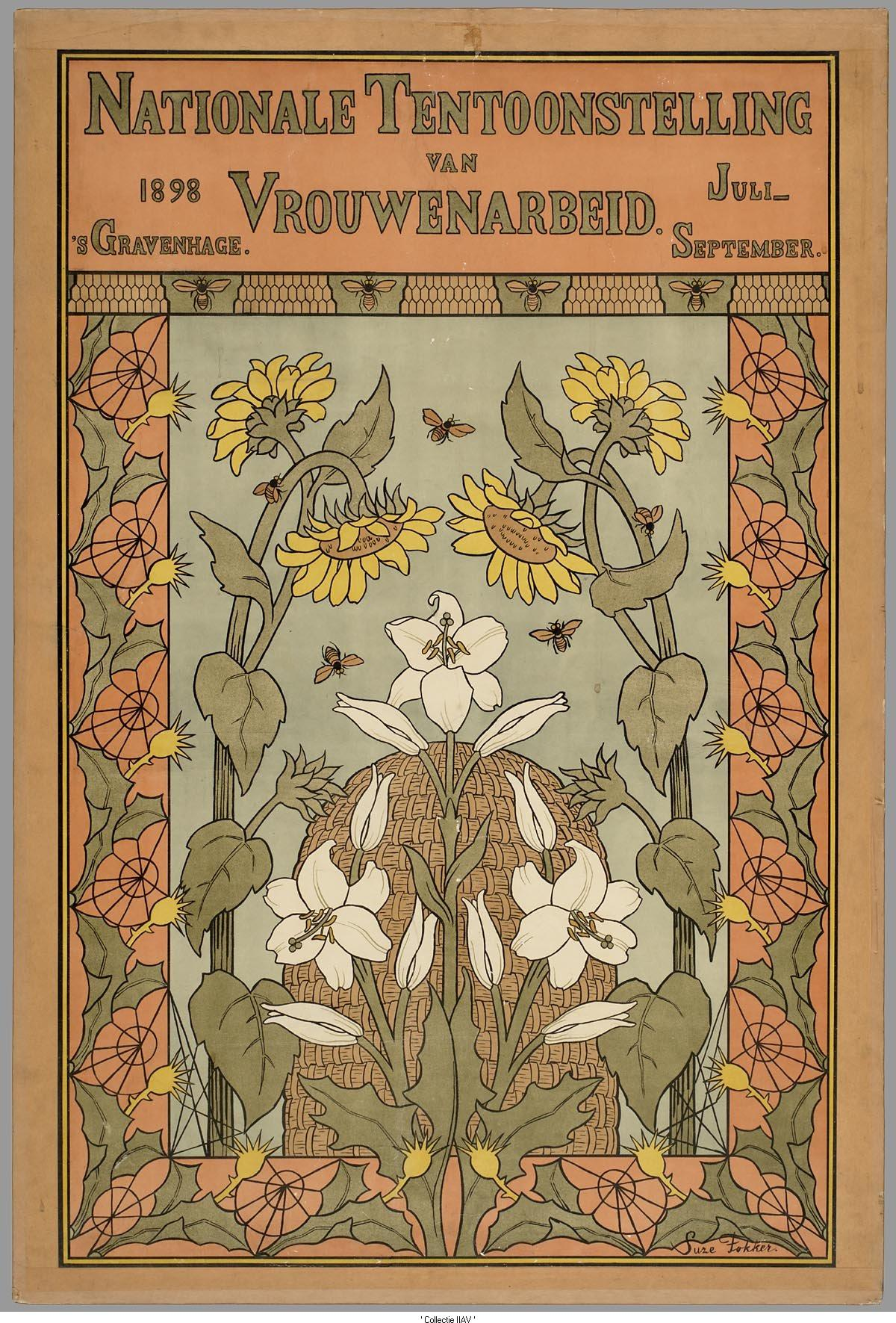
Announcement poster for the Exhibition for Women's Work 1898, an event for which Goekoop provided a site in The Hague

Adriaan Goekoop was born to Cornelis Goekoop (1819–1890) and Diderica Maria Goekoop (1818–1872). His father was a successful politician, serving as mayor of Goedereede (1844–1859), Ouddorp (1852–1856), and Stellendam (1852–1859). During the construction of Alexanderstraat in The Hague, Goekoop's parents were among the early residents, purchasing a building there. Goekoop spent his entire childhood at number 17, close to Plein 1813. He pursued legal studies in Leiden, receiving his degree in 1888. When his father Cornelis died on 17 January 1890, Adriaan inherited his real estate and took residence in his house on Laan van Meerdervoort.

=== Marriages ===
In 1890, Goekoop married the noblewoman Cécile de Jong van Beek en Donk, daughter of a prosecutor general in 's-Hertogenbosch and a significant landowner in The Hague. As she was not fond of the name Adriaan, she preferred to call him 'Paul'. Cécile went on to become a well-known feminist writer and played an instrumental role in organizing the Nationale Tentoonstelling van Vrouwenarbeid 1898 in The Hague, which took place from July to September 1898. During this period, a temporary separation occurred between the couple. She spent several months living in Rome. They reconciled in 1899, but later that year decided to divorce.

Goekoop married for the second time in 1905, to art historian Dr. Johanna de Jongh (1877–1946). The couple had three children: Dr. Cornelis (1906–1968, father of Mayor Cees Goekoop), Johanna (1907), and Adriaan (1908–1977). Johanna was a trailblazer in her field, having been the first woman to graduate from Berlin in 1903 (with the dissertation Holland und die Landschaft). From 1904, she lectured in Utrecht as a private docent, another first for women. The couple shared a love for antiquity, particularly classical archaeology. In 1929, she purchased and extensively renovated the dilapidated Castle De Essenburgh, retaining ownership until its sale in 1944 to Bernard Carp, even though she had relocated to Ginneken in 1935.

== Work ==
As The Hague's city center grew increasingly congested, there was a pressing demand for residential areas outside of the city's canal belt. In response, Goekoop founded several subsidiaries, each focusing on a specific district, including the Company for the Exploitation of Real Estate Laan van Meerdervoort. He continually expanded his land holdings; in 1895, for example, he purchased a dune landscape and began developing the first streets of the Statenkwartier. This work resulted in large, square-like intersections such as Frederik Hendrikplein, Prins Mauritsplein, and Statenplein.

=== Zorgvliet ===
The story of Zorgvliet was unique. The estate had previously belonged to King Willem II, then Anna Paulowna, and later her daughter, Sophie. After Sophie married Charles Alexander, Grand Duke of Saxe-Weimar-Eisenach, the couple often summered at the Catshuis on Zorgvliet. She sold parcels of the land that later became the Statenkwartier and Duinoord districts. Upon Sophie's death in 1897, her sons sold Zorgvliet in lots. Goekoop purchased not only a significant amount of land there, but he had also previously bought part of Zorgvliet from prior owners. At one point, he owned 36 hectares of land in the area.

== Archaeological work ==
In 1906, the Goekoop family moved to the monumental villa 'Goekoop' in the Haagse Bos. Here, under their own direction, they carried out a series of excavations. After Adriaan's death, Johanna continued this work and also began to publish about it.

== Cultural ==
From his school days, Adriaan had an interest in history and ancient Greece, an interest that stayed with him throughout his life. However, his interests also extended to the development of other matters. He made donations to the Gymnasium Haganum, the Hague Cooking School, the Eye Hospital on Tasmanstraat, and he supported the excavations in Voorburg of Forum Hadriani. He was a board member of the Arentsburgh association. In 1902, he bought an Old Egyptian burial chamber from the Egyptian government which he donated to the National Museum of Antiquities in Leiden. He also supported excavation activities outside the Netherlands. And during the Balkan War, he donated 40,000 guilders for the Dutch deployment of an ambulance in Greece.

He traveled extensively to Greece and was involved in several excavations. He also maintained contact with Wilhelm Dörpfeld. In his book Ithaque, la Grande (1908), he discusses this.

== Death ==
Adriaan Goekoop died on 24 September 1914 in The Hague. After his death, his wife continued the work in the villa and the villa itself is now a listed building.

== Trivia ==
- In The Hague, the Adriaan Goekooplaan building is named after him.
- Cees Goekoop, mayor of Leiden (1980–1999), was a grandson of Adriaan and Johanna Goekoop.

== Publications ==
- Adriaan Goekoop: The State as a Landowner. (Leiden Dissertation). Leiden, Somerwil, 1888.
- Adriaan Goekoop: Ithaque, la Grande. Athens, Beck & Barth, 1908.
