= Franz Studniczka =

German professor of classical archaeology

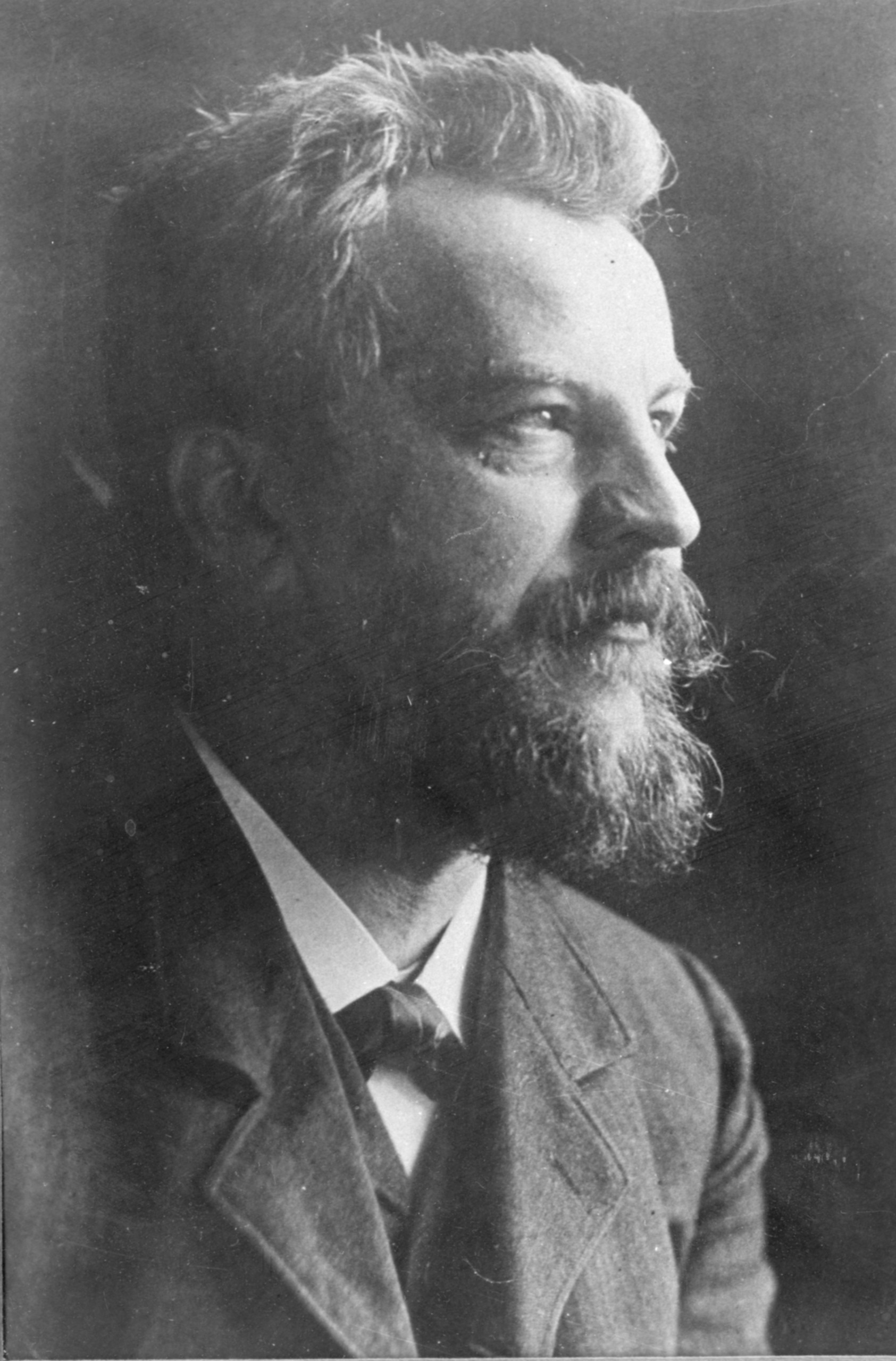
Franz Studniczka (1860–1929)

Franz Studniczka (14 August 1860 – 4 December 1929) was a German professor of classical archaeology born in Jasło, Galicia.

He studied classical archaeology in Vienna as a pupil of Otto Benndorf (1838–1907). In 1887 he received his habilitation in Vienna, and in 1889 became the Chair of Classical Archaeology at the University of Freiburg.

In 1896, Studniczka was appointed Professor of Classical Archaeology at the University of Leipzig, succeeding Johannes Overbeck (1826–1895) who had died the previous November. Studniczka was a member of the Saxon Academy of Sciences at Leipzig University.

Studniczka was a leading authority on ancient Greek and Roman art and antiquities. He was responsible for the expansion of the collection of casts of antique sculptures at the Museum of Antiquities at Leipzig which eventually became one of the largest and most impressive collection of casts in Germany. He is also credited for the masterful restoration of the Artemis-Iphigenie-Gruppe.

== Selected publications ==
- Beiträge zur Geschichte der altgriechischen Tracht, 1886
- Kyrene, eine altgriechische Göttin (Cyrene, an ancient Greek goddess), 1890
- Kalamis. Ein Beitrag zur griechischen Kunstgeschichte (Calamis, a contribution to Greek art), 1907
- Das Bildnis des Aristoteles (Portrait of Aristotle), 1908
- Das Symposion Ptolemaios II: Nach der Beschreibung des Kallixeinos (The Symposium Ptolemaios II: After the description of Kallixenos), 1914
- Das Bildnis Menanders (The Menander Effigies) in Neue Jarbucher fur das Klassische Altertum 21 (1918).
- Die Ostgiebelgruppe vom Zeustempel in Olympia (Eastern gable group of the Temple of Zeus, Olympia), 1923.
- "The Sophocles Statues"; Journal of Hellenic Studies 43 (1923): 57–67.
