= Kyriakos Pittakis =

Greek archaeologist (1798–1863)

- Κυριακός Πιττάκης
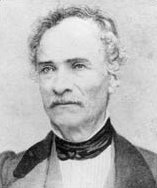
- Pittakis, c. 1850
- Born: Kyriakos S. Pittakis; 1798; Athens, Ottoman Empire
- Died: 4 November [O.S. 23 October] 1863 (aged 65); Athens, Kingdom of Greece
- Occupation: Archaeologist
- Employer: Greek Archaeological Service
- Known for: First Greek Ephor General of Antiquities; restoration of the Acropolis of Athens
- Title: Ephor General (1843–1863)
- Spouse: Aikaterini Makri
- Children: At least 1

Signature
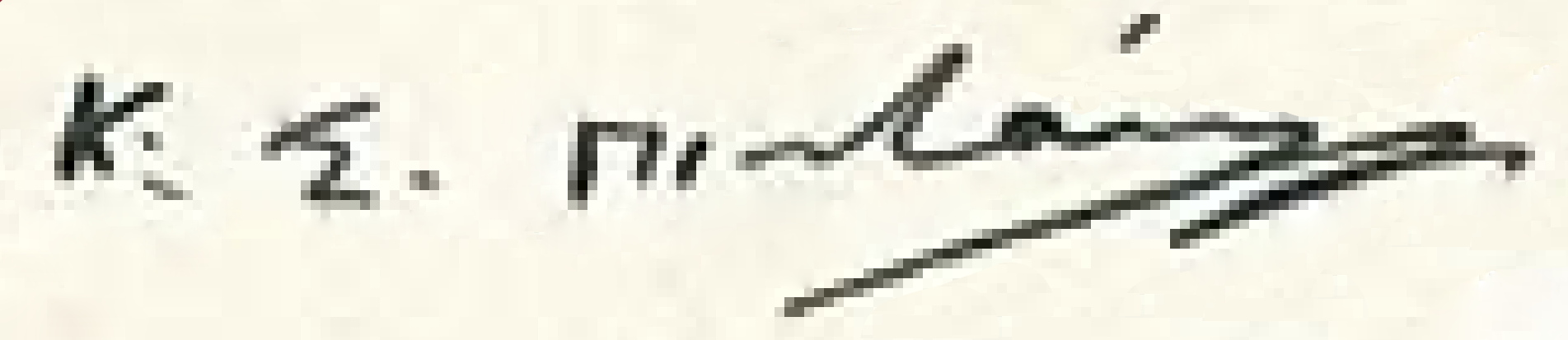

Kyriakos S. Pittakis (also Pittakys; Greek: Κυριακός Σ. Πιττάκης; 1798 – 4 November [O.S. 23 October] 1863) (Note: Until 1923, Greece used the Julian calendar, known as the Old Style.) was a Greek archaeologist. He was the first Greek to serve as Ephor General of Antiquities, the head of the Greek Archaeological Service, in which capacity he carried out the conservation and restoration of several monuments on the Acropolis of Athens. He has been described as a "dominant figure in Greek archaeology for 27 years", and as "one of the most important epigraphers of the nineteenth century".

Pittakis was largely self-taught as an archaeologist, and one of the few native Greeks active in the field during the late Ottoman period and the early years of the Kingdom of Greece. He played an influential role in the early years of the Greek Archaeological Service and was a founding member of the Archaeological Society of Athens, a private body which undertook the excavation, conservation and publication of archaeological finds. He was responsible for much of the early excavation and restoration of the Acropolis, including efforts to restore the Erechtheion, the Parthenon, the Temple of Athena Nike and the Propylaia. As ephor of the Central Public Museum for Antiquities from 1836, and later as Ephor General, he was largely responsible for the conservation and protection of many of the monuments and artefacts then known from Ancient Greece.

Pittakis has been described as the last representative of the "heroic period" of Greek archaeologists. He was prolific both as an excavator and as an archaeological writer, publishing by his own estimation more than 4,000 inscriptions. He has been praised for his extensive efforts to uncover and protect Greece's classical heritage, particularly in Athens and the adjacent islands, but criticised for his unsystematic and incautious approach. His reconstructions of ancient monuments often prioritised aesthetics over fidelity to the original, and were largely reverted after his death. He has also been accused of allowing his strong nationalist beliefs to influence his reconstruction of ancient monuments, and of distorting the archaeological record to suit his own beliefs.

== Early life ==
Kyriakos S. Pittakis was born in Athens in 1798. (Note: Some sources (e.g. Maniatea 2022) give his birthplace as the district of Psyri, where a modern street is named after him.) His family origins are obscure; he was probably from a humble background. A contemporary described him as having been born "beneath a forgotten cornice of the Acropolis … which protectively sheltered his cradle." (Note: The French historian Jean Alexandre Buchon, 1840/1841, quoted in Mallouchou-Tufano 2007, p. 42) He received his early schooling from Ioannis Palamas, son of the educationalist Panagiotis Palamas, and studied at the School of the Commons of Athens from 1810 until 1820. (Note: Epigraphic Museum of Athens 2021; Tsouli 2020, p. 267. The school's name is given in Greek as Σχολή του Κοινού των Αθηνών (Scholi tou Koinou ton Athinon).) Pittakis seems to have been largely self-taught in archaeology, but became apprenticed around the age of sixteen to the French vice-consul Louis-François-Sébastien Fauvel, sometimes called the "father of archaeology in Greece". During this period, Pittakis established his interest in epigraphy, copying inscriptions from the Acropolis and concealing moveable antiquities from Ottoman forces. (Note: Athens had been under Ottoman rule since its conquest in 1456.) He was also supported in his early archaeological work by the Philomousos Hetaireia, a learned society with a particular interest in antiquities and the education of the Greek population: in 1817, he was listed as receiving support from the society for his studies.

Pittakis is said to have met and befriended the English aristocrat, poet and philhellene Lord Byron. Teresa Makri, the sister of Pittakis's wife Aikaterini, is generally considered the inspiration for the "Maid of Athens" of Byron's 1811 poem. (Note: Some primary sources incorrectly suggest that Pittakis was married to Teresa: see for instance Förster 1854, p. 21.)

=== Greek War of Independence ===
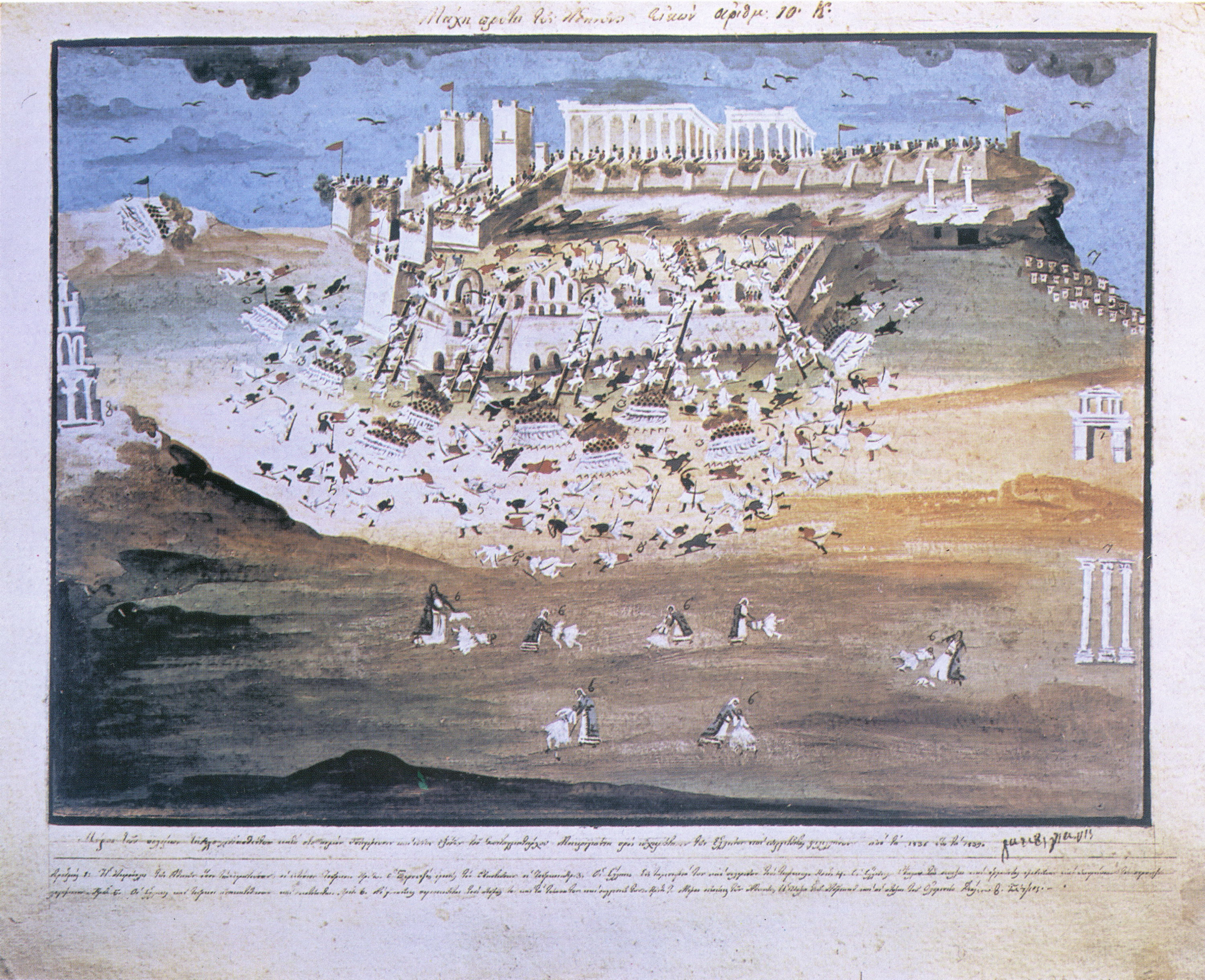
A painting of the 1821–1822 siege of the Acropolis, in which Pittakis participated, by Panagiotis Zographos

After growing tensions and preparations throughout the early months of 1821, the Greek War of Independence began in March. When rebel villagers from Attica entered Athens on behalf of the revolutionaries in April, the Turkish garrison retreated to the Acropolis. Ottoman forces briefly recaptured the city in July, but largely departed in August, leaving only a small force behind, whereupon the population rebelled again, forcing the Turks back to the Acropolis and beginning the First Siege of the Acropolis, which would continue until 22 June [O.S. 10 June] 1822.

At the age of eighteen, Pittakis was inducted into the Philiki Hetaireia, (Note: Greek: Φιλικὴ Ἑταιρεία, lit. 'Society of Friends'.) a nationalist secret society formed to oppose Ottoman rule in Greece. He may have been initiated into the society by Philippos Ioannou, later a noted classicist, and Alexandros Rizos Rangavis, who became Pittakis's friend and rival throughout his life. (Note: Another version of events records that he was recruited by the future priest and revolutionary Anthimos Gazis, who was active in the Philomousos Hetaireia.) Pittakis was present in Athens during 1821–1822, and a member of the irregular Greek force that besieged and eventually retook the Acropolis. He may have witnessed, or participated in, the massacre of several hundred Turkish prisoners from the siege in June 1822: (Note: The precise number of Turkish captives killed is unclear: estimates vary from 400 to around 600.) his mentor Fauvel, the French vice-consul, sheltered some of the survivors in his own home until the arrival of two French warships allowed their evacuation.

Pittakis was given charge of Athens's water supply, and later claimed credit for the 1821 rediscovery of the klepsydra, an ancient spring on the Acropolis, which ensured a fresh water supply to the Greek forces who occupied the site between 1822 and 1827. This was the first rediscovery of a lost monument from Athens's classical period. However, the discovery was also claimed by the Greek military leader Odysseas Androutsos and by the Swiss scholar Felix Stähelin, and is likely to have originally been accidental. During his service in 1822, he acquired the manuscript of the Chronicle of Anthimos, a history of Athens written by the late eighteenth-century educator Ioannis Venizelos, which Pittakis would eventually publish in 1853. He also spent time during 1821–1822 on the islands of Aegina and Salamis, both off the shore of Attica, where he recorded several inscriptions that had been moved there from Athens on account of the fighting.

For his service in the War of Independence, Pittakis was later awarded a "certificate of patriotism" by the Athenian city government. His brother was killed and buried on the Acropolis during the war, either during the first siege or the second, which took place in 1826–1827. During and after the war, Pittakis corresponded with the British architect Thomas Leverton Donaldson, sharing with him news of archaeological discoveries to which scholars outside Greece no longer had access.

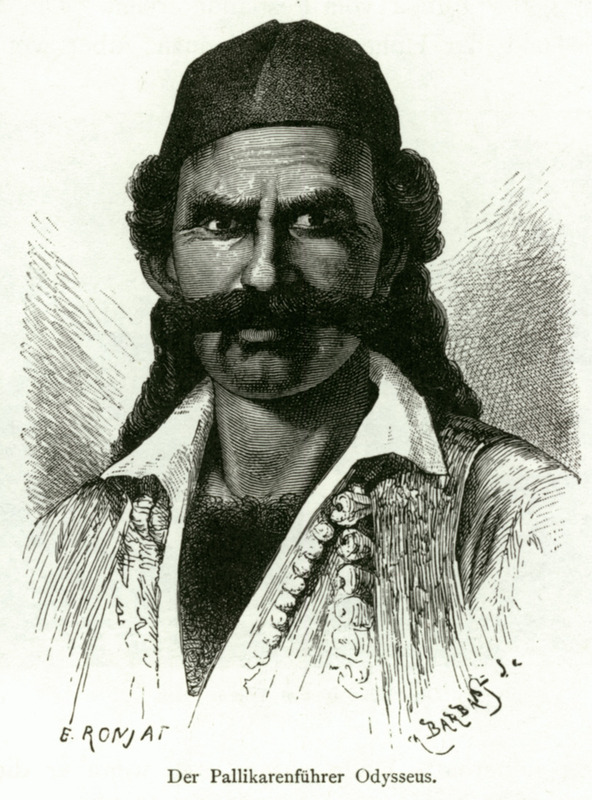
Portrait of Odysseas Androutsos, drawn in 1887

==== Reputed 'columns for cannonballs' exchange ====
According to a much-cited anecdote, during the first siege of the Acropolis, the Ottoman occupiers began to run low on lead ammunition, and began to destroy the marble columns of the Parthenon in order to remove the lead clamps which held them together. Pittakis, in an effort to preserve the ancient temple, is said to have offered to send ammunition to the Turkish defenders, as long as they left the columns intact. The laconic phrase "here are bullets, do not touch the columns!" is often associated with the alleged incident.

The story is most likely apocryphal. Contemporary reports from the siege indicate that the Greeks themselves fired artillery into the Acropolis ruins, and the offer of ammunition to preserve the ruins is first attested in an 1859 letter by the writer Aristotelis Valaoritis, in which the protagonist is named as Odysseas Androutsos, who only arrived in Athens two months after the Acropolis was retaken. It was first connected with Pittakis by Rangavis in his eulogy for Pittakis after the latter's death in 1863. The modern historian James Beresford has suggested that the origin, or at least the popularity, of the anecdote may lie in the growth of the Megali Idea (Note: Greek: Μεγάλη Ιδέα, lit. ''Great Idea''.) – an irredentist, nationalist ideology calling for the "return" of classical Greek lands to the modern Greek state – in the mid-19th century, and the desire to strengthen the perceived links between modern Greeks and the heritage of Ancient Greece.

The story has, however, been described as a "powerful myth" with a prominent place in the Greek national discourse, particularly around the debate over the restitution of the Parthenon marbles taken from the temple by Lord Elgin in the early nineteenth century, while Athens was still under Ottoman rule. (Note: Beresford 2016, p. 903. For the dates of Elgin's removals, see St. Clair 1998, pp. 102, 160) It has been referenced by the Greek Minister of Culture Melina Mercouri and the archaeologist Manolis Andronikos as historical fact, in an effort to argue for the sculptures' return.

== Archaeological career ==
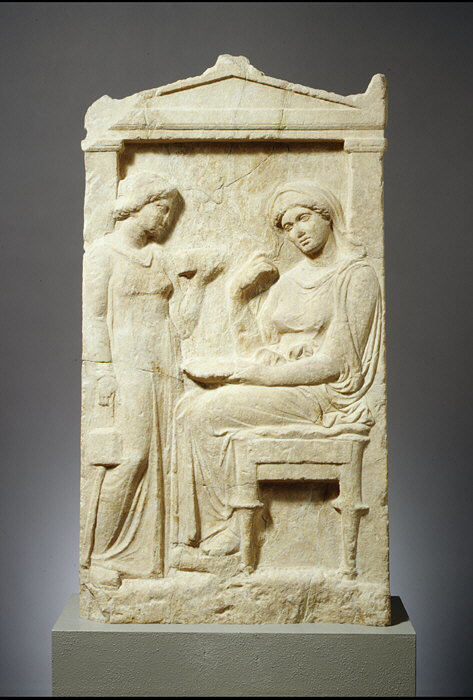
The grave stele of Phainippe (c. 400 – c. 390 BCE), found by Pittakis on Aegina in early 1829

Shortly after the expulsion of the main body of the Ottoman forces from Athens in 1822, Pittakis began to gather archaeological artefacts from around the city into the Church of the Megali Panagia, which was built on the former site of Hadrian's Library, creating one of Greece's first archaeological museums. Between 1824 and 1828, he attended the Ionian Academy on Corfu, where he was taught by the scholar and classicist Konstantinos Asopios. He studied modern languages, Latin and medicine – medicine being a common field of study for Greek intellectuals of the time, who often sought education in Germany, where legal, philological and architectural training were difficult for them to come by. According to the archaeological historian Vasileios Petrakos, it was on Corfu that Pittakis met his wife, Aikaterini, a fellow native of Athens. During his studies, he continued his archaeological work, returning in 1825–1826 to Salamis to transcribe and catalogue further inscriptions.

In 1828, he unsuccessfully petitioned Ioannis Kapodistrias, who had become independent Greece's first head of state in 1827, for an archaeological post; Kapodistrias instead offered him the post of first secretary to the law-court of Elis, which Pittakis refused. Pittakis later recalled that Kapodistrias had advised him to learn English, so that he could guide English-speaking tourists around Athens's archaeological remains and gather information as to their views on Greece and its government, and to abandon what he said Kapodistrias had called his "delusional ideas" about the ancient Greeks: according to Pittakis, Kapodistrias had told him that the ancients were "restless heads, from whom we … can learn practically nothing." (Note: Quoted by Ludwig Ross, further quoted by Petrakos 2004, p. 122.) Pittakis returned to Athens, where he resumed his early work of collecting inscriptions, sending several to the German scholar August Böckh for inclusion in the Corpus Inscriptionum Graecarum. On 27 March 1828 [O.S. 15 March], he announced the publication of his first book, which he claimed to contain 1,600 newly-published inscriptions. He excavated on Salamis and Aegina in early 1829, and sent several objects to Andreas Moustoxydis, the director of Greece's national archaeological museum (then based on Aegina), for display.

=== Greek Archaeological Service ===
Since at least 1822, the Greek revolutionaries of the War of Independence had proclaimed that any independent Greek state would be ruled by a hereditary monarch from a European royal family, both to demonstrate compliance with the conservative values of the European Great Powers and to appeal to the political interests of those states in choosing the monarch. On 7 May [O.S. 25 April] 1832, representatives of Britain, France and Russia selected the Bavarian prince Otto von Wittelsbach as Greece's king.

In August 1832, the German archaeologist Ludwig Ross travelled to Athens, as a guest of Jacob Black, Pittakis' brother-in-law; Ross's first visit in the city was to Pittakis's home, where the two discussed Pittakis's meeting with Kapodistrias and the latter's attitudes to Greece's past. On 13 September [O.S. 1 September], Pittakis was appointed to the unpaid role of "custodian of the antiquities in Athens", (Note: Petrakos 2011, p. 136. Petrakos gives the title in Greek, as ἐπιστάτης τῶν ἐν Ἀθήναις ἀρχαιοτήτων (epistatis ton en Athinais archaiotiton).) in which capacity he gave tours of the Acropolis to foreign visitors: one of whom was the American author and poet Nathaniel Parker Willis, who recalled being shown Byron's graffito of his own name on one of the columns of the Erechtheion. Accepting the role on 20 November [O.S. 8 November], Pittakis proposed to the Minister for Education, Iakovos Rizos Neroulos, that his role include responsibility for collecting the Acropolis's scattered antiquities, and establishing a museum in which they could be stored.

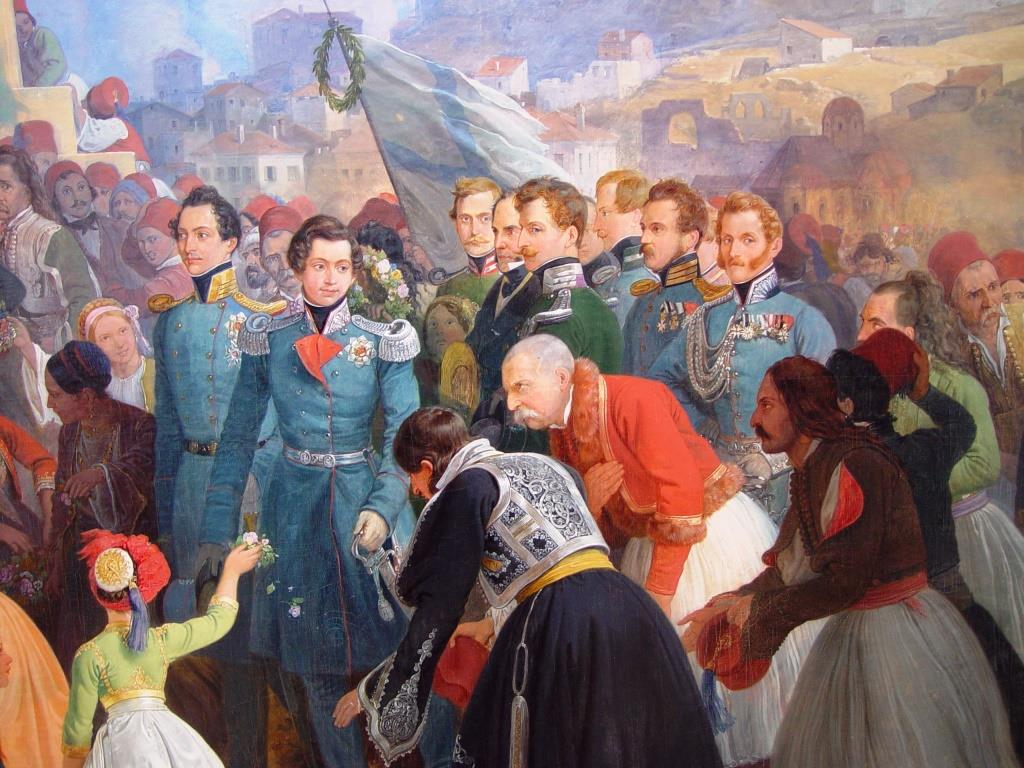
The reception of the new king Otto in Athens on 23 May [O.S. 11 May] 1833, painted by Peter von Hess in 1839

The new king Otto arrived in Greece at Nafplio, then the national capital, on 6 February [O.S. 25 January] 1833. Pittakis was part of a delegation sent from Athens to welcome him. A decree of 17 July [O.S. 5 July] by the Minister for Education Spyridon Trikoupis founded the Greek Archaeological Service, as part of which Pittakis was appointed "sub-ephor" of Central Greece, reporting to the Bavarian architect Adolf Weissenberg; Ross, meanwhile, was appointed sub-ephor for the Peloponnese. (Note: Petrakos 2011, p. 57. Petrakos gives the title sub-ephor in Greek, as ὑποέφορος (hupoephoros).) Pittakis was one of only three native Greeks employed by the archaeological service. (Note: Another Greek, Ioannis Kokkonis, was hired at the same time as Pittakis, as sub-ephor for the Aegean Islands; the artist Athanasios Iatridis was also hired as the Archaeological Service's draughtsman. At the time, Greek archaeology was dominated by scholars from northern Europe, particularly Bavaria, who enjoyed King Otto's favour.) He was formally sworn in on 6 August [O.S. 25 July]. Around the same time, he was asked by the state to recommend a site for an archaeological museum in Athens, following a request from the local prefect for 300 drachmas, approximately equivalent to a month of an upper-middle-class salary, to repair the Temple of Hephaestus (then known as the Theseion) for the purpose. Pittakis instead recommended the Propylaia, and asked only for 50 drachmas to build it a new door.

Despite the recognition of the new Greek state by the Ottoman government under the Treaty of Constantinople of 30 August [O.S. 18 August] 1832, the Turkish garrison on the Acropolis did not surrender until March 1833, and some of its soldiers would remain on the site until 1835. Three days after Pittakis's return to Athens on 15 August [O.S. 3 August] 1833, he informed Trikoupis that he had forbidden entry to the Acropolis to anyone not accompanied by him. Now empowered to do so, he carried out his first formal works on the Acropolis, demolishing Frankish and Turkish remains in central part of the Propylaia and its north-east hall, known as the pinakotheke. He also began to collect together some of the scattered antiquities from the Acropolis, many of which were the remains of bombardments during the site's two recent sieges. He established a temporary museum for these objects in a former barracks.

Among Pittakis's other duties was the financial assessment of antiquities presented by excavators and collectors to the government, which determined the reward paid for them by the state. A month after Pittakis's arrival in Athens, a cadet of the British Royal Navy broke the nose off a sculpture from the Parthenon Frieze: the cadet was fined £3 (equivalent to £309 in 2025). Pittakis requested the money for the restoration of other ancient monuments, and later claimed to have written about the matter to Pulteney Malcolm, the commander-in-chief of Britain's Mediterranean Fleet. The proceeds from the fine were used to support the first excavations around the Parthenon, (Note: Petrakos 2004, p. 140. For the excavations' status as the first around the Parthenon, see Petrakos 2007, p. 27.) which had begun on 22 April [O.S. 10 April] with funding from an Athenian antiquarian society, and which Pittakis was engaged in conducting: according to Rangavis, this cash injection was vital in ensuring their continuation. Pittakis cleared the temple's surroundings of medieval and early modern buildings, and recovered artefacts including three fragments of its north frieze, a metope and various inscriptions. The excavation was visited by Otto in 1833, during his first visit to the Acropolis.

After the withdrawal of the Turkish garrison, the Acropolis of Athens was occupied by a Bavarian military garrison. On 30 August [O.S. 18 August] 1834, by a royal decree issued on the advice of the Bavarian architect Leo von Klenze, the troops were dismissed from the Acropolis and the area declared an archaeological site. Despite Pittakis's existing status as "custodian" of its antiquities and the fact that Athens fell under the jurisdiction of his sub-ephorate, he was not selected to carry out the restoration work: instead, the task went to the German-born Ross, a favourite of King Otto, who was recommended by Klenze directly. Ross worked mostly alongside architects from northern Europe, particularly the Prussian Eduard Schaubert, the Danish Christian Hansen and the Saxon Eduard Laurent, an architect from Dresden. The dominance of non-Greek scholars in the excavation and conservation of Greek monuments provoked resentment from the native Greek intelligentsia, and tensions between Pittakis and Ross.

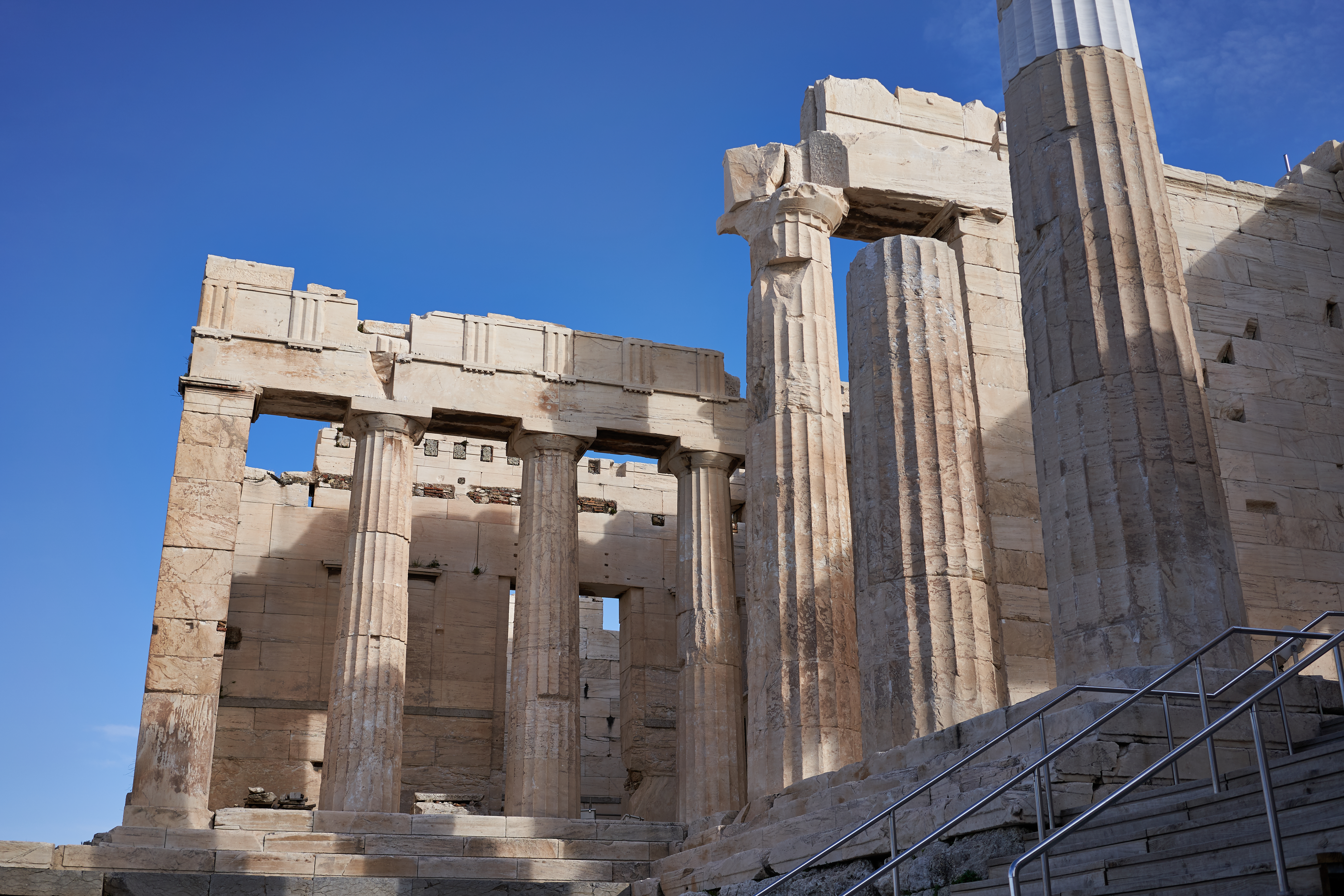
The Propylaia on the Acropolis of Athens. The pinakotheke can be seen on the left.

Construction work on the Church of the Megali Panagia between 1834 and 1835 necessitated the removal of its archaeological collection, which by then included 618 artefacts, to the Theseion. In 1835, Pittakis published a monograph in French on the topography and ruins of Athens. The work made extensive use of epigraphy, including (as Pittakis claimed) over 800 then-unpublished inscriptions, (Note: Pittakis 1835, quoted in Papazarkadas 2014, p. 402.) and has been described as the first epigraphical work written by an ethnic Greek. In this volume, he published the discovery of several Ionic column capitals in the wall of the Church of the Agia Kyra Kandili near the Choragic Monument of Lysicrates, along with a dedication to Hestia, which he took to indicate an ancient temple. Modern scholarship has suggested that these were part of the temple and civic building known as the Prytaneion, containing the sacred fire of Hestia seen as the heart of the political community. The original location of this structure, which served various public and political functions during the classical period, is no longer known.

=== "Naval Records Affair" of 1836 ===
Pittakis had a long-running feud with Ross, Greece's Ephor General of Antiquities from 1834, which reflected wider tensions between native Greek archaeologists and the mostly-Bavarian scholars who, on the invitation of King Otto, dominated Greek archaeology in the early years of Otto's reign. In 1834 and 1835, excavations in the Piraeus, Athens's ancient harbour, uncovered a series of inscriptions known as the "Naval Records", which gave information on the administration and financing of the Athenian navy between the fifth and fourth centuries BCE. Pittakis studied the inscriptions and published two articles on them on 19 July [O.S. 7 July] and 9 August [O.S. 28 July] 1836; the articles have been described in twenty-first-century scholarship as "bad from every point of view". Ross replied with two articles of his own on 29 July [O.S. 17 July] and 10 August [O.S. 28 July], calling Pittakis's work "full of the most palpable errors"; Pittakis wrote to the secretariat of the Archaeological Service demanding "due satisfaction" for what he considered Ross's insult, but was instead ordered to apologise to Ross.

Ross sent sketches of the inscriptions to Böckh for the Corpus Inscriptionum Graecarum, despite having not yet received approval to publish them. The Greek authorities asserted that Ross's actions were illegal: Pittakis attacked Ross in the press, which largely sided with him, thanks to his service in the War of Independence and xenophobia towards Ross as an ethnic German. Public pressure forced Ross's resignation as Ephor General on 20 September [O.S. 8 September] 1836, though the Education Minister Iakovos Rizos Neroulos unsuccessfully petitioned Prime Minister Josef Ludwig von Armansperg to refuse it. Eleven days later, Ross attempted to return to the Acropolis to study the inscriptions unearthed during his excavations there, but Pittakis denied him entry. He continued to write hostile articles against Ross until 1838, accusing him of allowing foreign journals privileged access to Greek inscriptions, of improperly giving antiquities to the German nobleman Hermann von Pückler-Muskau, and of plotting to flee the country with antiquities in his possession. The affair led to a break between Pittakis and Rangavis, whose initial support for Pittakis turned into opposition as the situation evolved: the archaeological historian Nikolaos Papazarkadas has described the subsequent relationship between the two men as "rather complicated".

Papazarkadas has argued that Pittakis's opposition to Ross's actions was personal rather than principled, pointing out that Pittakis made no protest against the copying of several thousand Greek inscriptions by French epigraphers from 1843 onwards, a project supported by the prime minister, Ioannis Kolettis. In September 1836, on Ross's resignation, Neroulos prepared a draft decree, by which the Archaeological Service would have been reorganised, giving Pittakis responsibility for its excavation work while the philologist Ioannis Benthylos assumed charge of its academic works and Athanasios Iatridis oversaw its technical work. However, the proposal was considered too radical, and a royal decree of 14 October [O.S. 2 October] affirmed that the organisation of the Archaeological Service would continue unchanged, with the post of Ephor General unfilled. Pittakis was instead given the title of "Ephor of the Central Public Museum for Antiquities", referring to the collection of antiquities that he had assembled, first in the Church of the Megali Panagia and since 1835 in the Temple of Hephaestus. (Note: In 1837, at Pittakis's instigation, the collection was moved to the Stoa of Hadrian in Hadrian's Library; in 1841, it moved again to the office of the Ephor General of Antiquities in the Ministry of Education, and from 1843 it was displayed in the Tower of the Winds. Finally, it was transferred to the newly-constructed Acropolis Museum in 1874.) This made him the most senior archaeologist employed by the Greek Archaeological Service, and its de facto head.

=== Archaeological Society of Athens ===
Floor plan of the Erechtheion

On 29 December [O.S. 17 December] 1836, Pittakis and the philanthropist Konstantinos Bellios visited the Acropolis of Athens, where Bellios suggested to Pittakis the founding of a "Society for the Excavation and Discovery of Antiquities", (Note: Maniatea 2022. Maniatea gives the name in Greek, as Εταιρεία περί ανασκαφής και ανακαλύψεως αρχαιοτήτων (Etaireia peri anaskafis kai anakalypseos archaiotiton).) with the purpose of restoring the monuments of the site. A proposal was submitted to Neroulos and Rangavis, now Neroulos's superior in the Ministry of Education; the organisation's founding documents were completed in the name of the Archaeological Society of Athens on 18 January [O.S. 6 January] 1837, and its foundation ratified by a royal decree of 27 January [O.S. 15 January] 1837. Neroulos became the society's first president, with Rangavis as its secretary and Pittakis a member of its ephorate (board of overseers). Where Rangavis, Neroulos and Bellios were wealthy Phanariots (a class of mostly-wealthy Greek merchants from Istanbul, who had enjoyed special privileges in the administration of the Ottoman Empire), Pittakis was unusual in the new society in being both Athenian and of a humble background, a factor which created tension between him and the other elites of the society. The Society held its first meeting on 10 May [O.S. 28 April] 1837, in the Parthenon.

The Archaeological Society aimed to support the Greek Archaeological Service, which had minimal financial and human resources, in conserving, studying and excavating the monuments of Greece. Along with Rangavis, Pittakis launched and edited the periodical Archaeological Journal, (Note: Generally known in scholarship by its Greek title, "Αρχαιολογική Εφημερίς" (Archaiologiki Efimeris).) which remains one of the society's main publications as of 2023. (Note: Petrakos 2007, p. 21. For the Journal's status in modern times, see Archaeological Society of Athens 2019.) Rangavis soon resigned as co-editor, leaving Pittakis as effectively the sole writer of the journal until 1860.

From 1837, Pittakis, assisted by the Swiss sculptor Heinrich Max Imhof and Ross's former collaborators Schaubert and Laurent, carried out restoration work in the Archaeological Society's name on the Acropolis. His work at the site has been described as the beginning of a "large-scale purification project", aimed at the removal of all of the Acropolis's post-classical remains. Throughout 1837–1840, he reconstructed the naos of the Erechtheion, a building he described as having "fallen down", using modern bricks to replace areas of fallen stonework. He also extended the height of some collapsed columns and rearranged surviving fragments of the building to emphasise the best preserved. During the reconstruction, one of the south porch's caryatids, which had fallen during the fighting of the War of Independence, was found and returned to its plinth. Pittakis also excavated the building, down to the floor level of its phase as a Christian church (between approximately the sixth and the fifteenth centuries), uncovering tombs in the southern part and a cistern in the western area. On 27 February [O.S. 15 February] 1839, he wrote to the Ministry of Education, proposing that a royal decree be issued to dramatically expand the powers of the state to protect antiquities and prosecute those damaging them, but his letter was never acted upon.

From 1841, he began to collaborate with Rangavis on the restoration of the Parthenon, having previously excavated its pronaos in the late 1830s. Between 1841 and 1844, they rebuilt parts of the naos and restored part of the north and south colonnades. As he had in the Erechtheion, Pittakis reinforced part of the Parthenon's north side with a large brick wall. He ordered casts from the British Museum to replace the Parthenon sculptures taken by Elgin, placing them directly onto the temple itself. Pittakis intended to rebuild the entire north colonnade, but was prevented from doing so by lack of funds. On behalf of the Archaeological Society, he excavated at Mycenae in 1841, clearing the approach to the Lion Gate and making a tentative exploration of the tholos tomb known as the Tomb of Clytemnestra. In 1842, Pittakis was placed in charge of all excavation on the Acropolis of Athens.

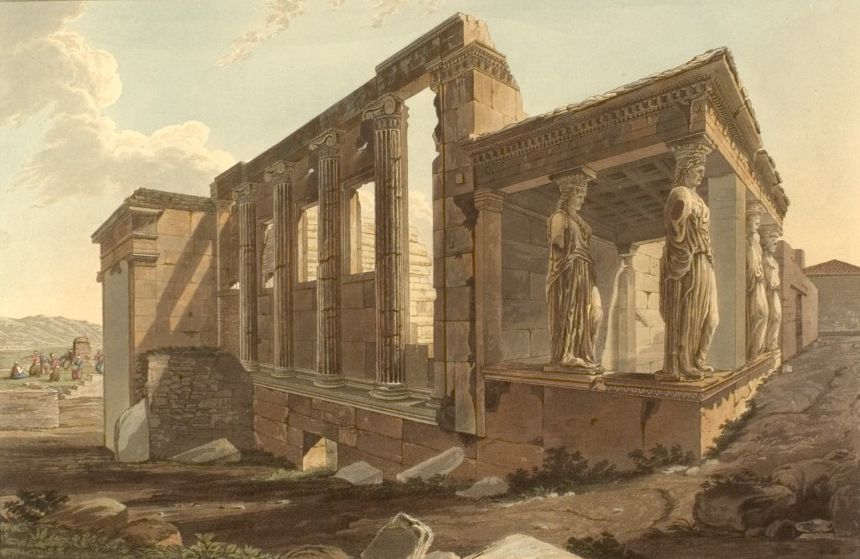
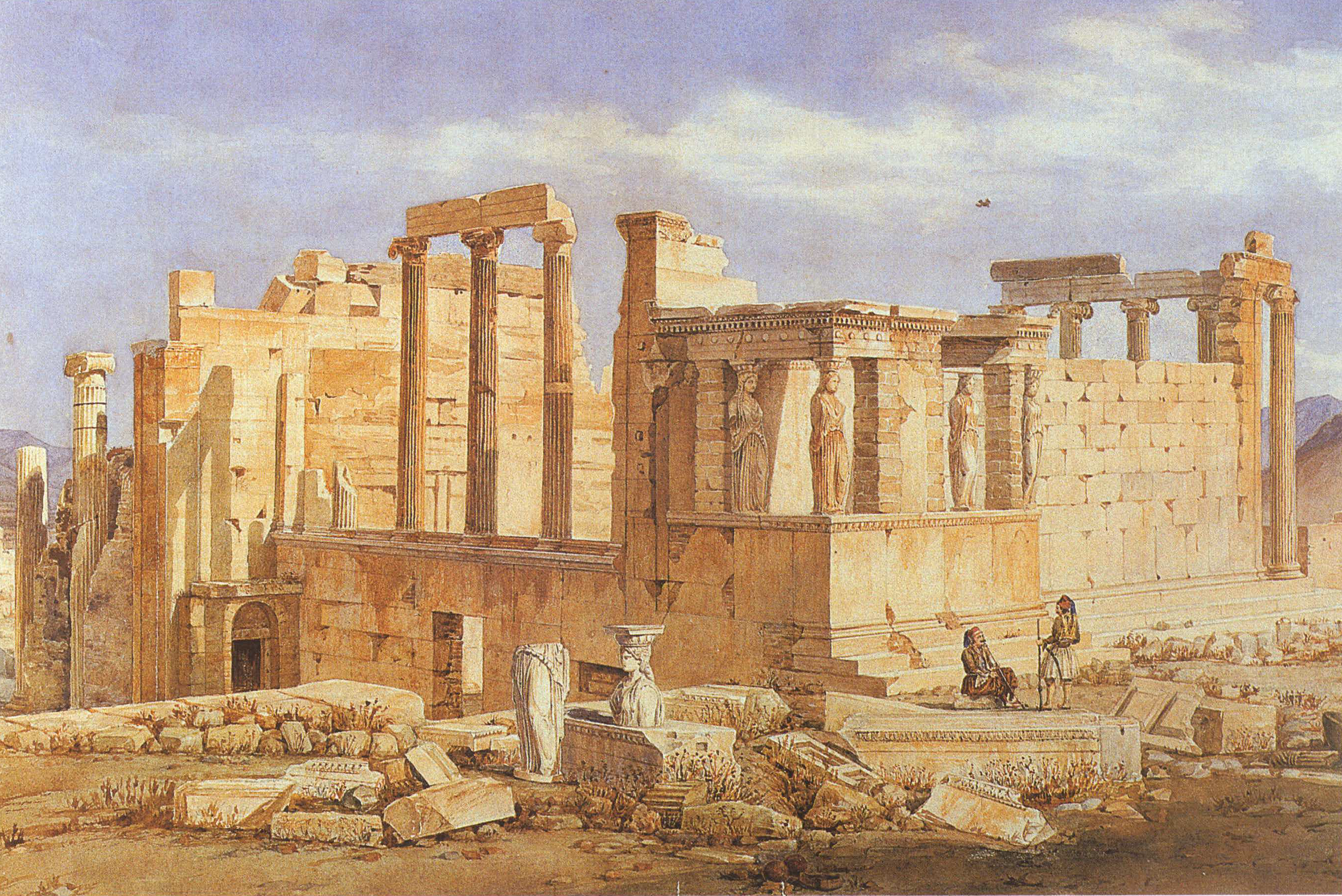
Two paintings showing the effect of Pittakis's restorations of the Erechtheion: left, by Edward Dodwell in 1821; right, by Christian Hansen in 1845

On 21 January [O.S. 9 January] 1851, following the resignation of Rangavis from the Archaeological Society, his duties were taken on by Skarlatos Vyzantios, the society's vice-secretary. On 22 April [O.S. 10 April], Pittakis announced to the society that he knew of a plot of land in the neighbourhood of Vrysaki, the area of the Ancient Agora of Athens, which he believed to contain significant antiquities, including the remains of the Bouleuterion (the ancient city's assembly building) and the temples known as the Metroon and the Tholos. (Note: Archaeological Society of Athens 2020a. For the location of the plot, see Dumont 2020, p. x.) At his instigation, the society sold shares in the National Bank of Greece to raise 12,000 drachmas (Note: Approximately equivalent to €72,400 in 2023, based on conversion rates in Bikelas 1868.) to buy the plot, which became known as the Psoma House after its former owner, named Louisa Psoma. Pittakis led the excavation, assisted by the society's archaeologists Panagiotis Efstratiadis and D. Charamis. Although the excavation furnished several ancient inscriptions, published by Efstratiadis in three volumes, it failed to uncover the promised ancient monuments; the archaeologist Konstantinos Kouroniotis found in 1910 that the antiquities discovered at the house were associated with the late Roman walls of the city. Rangavis requested permission to study the inscriptions found at the Psoma House, which the Archaeological Society refused.

At the society's elections of 26 September [O.S. 14 September] 1852, Pittakis was elected to succeed Vyzantios, who had been formally appointed as secretary on 30 June [O.S. 17 June]. At the suggestion of the German classical scholar Friedrich Thiersch, the society established a committee to report on the state of the Erechtheion, which included Pittakis, Efstratiadis and the society's president Georgios Glarakis. (Note: The other members of the committee were the architects Lysandros Kaftanzoglou, Panagis Kalkos and Dimitrios Zezos.) The society's financial situation in this period was precarious, partly owing to its purchase of the Psoma House and the society's erection of a marble stele commemorating its benefactors. In April 1854, on the outbreak of the Crimean War, British and French troops occupied the Piraeus with the aim of preventing Greece from assisting the Russian Empire against Ottoman Turkey. The occupation led to an outbreak of cholera, which lasted from June 1854 to January 1855 and killed around 3,000 people, including the Archaeological Society's president, Georgios Gennadios. The situation exacerbated the Archaeological Society's financial troubles so greatly that it effectively ceased to exist until 1858, though Pittakis continued writing and publishing the Archaeological Journal. Between 1851 and 1858, in the judgement of Petrakos, Pittakis was effectively the sole figure in both the Archaeological Society and Greek archaeology. When Pittakis wrote to the Ministry of Education in October 1855, informing them of Gennadios' death and requesting approval to call a meeting to reconstitute the society, he received no response. In 1858, the Minister for Education, Charalampos Christopoulos, asked Pittakis to reform the society and hold elections for new officials. These took place in the second half of the year: Pittakis was elected as secretary, a position which he handed over the following year to Stefanos Koumanoudis. On 5 June [O.S. 24 May] 1859, Pittakis was elected as vice-president of the society.

=== Ephor General of Antiquities (1843–1863) ===
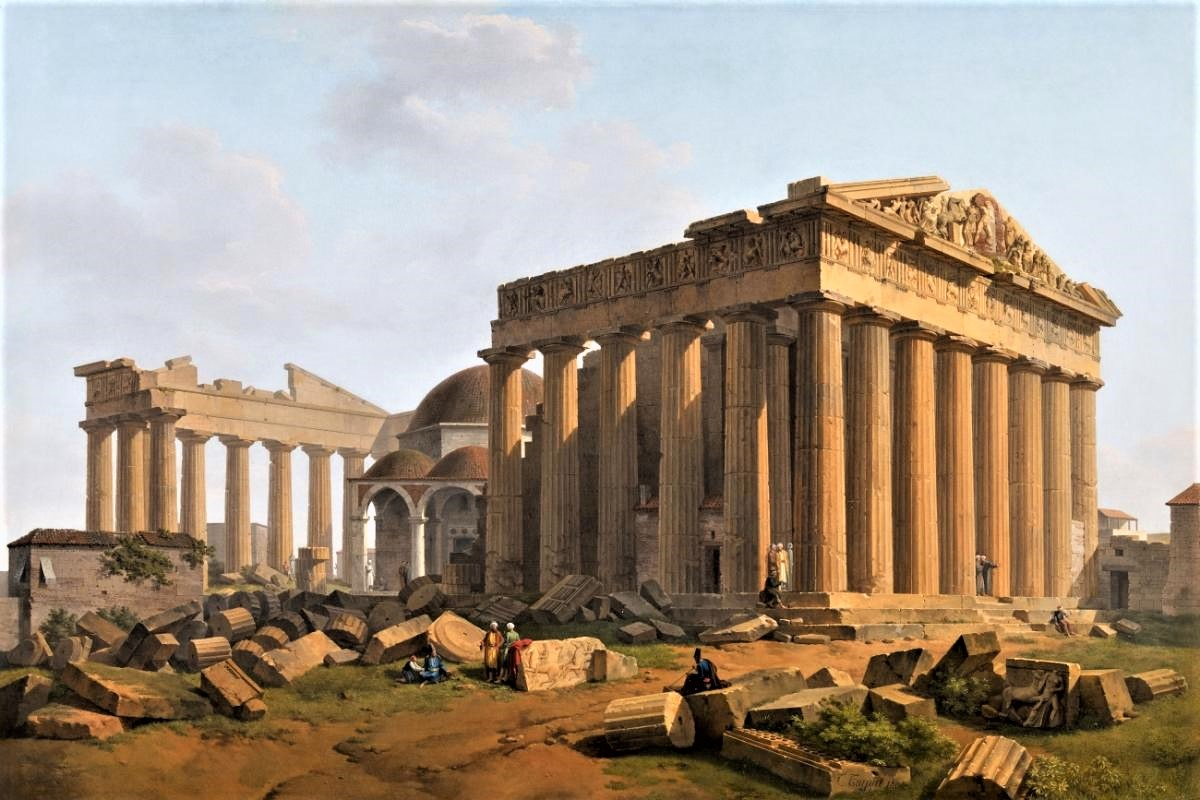
An 1804 painting of the Parthenon before Pittakis's restorations, by Lancelot-Théodore Turpin de Crissé. The Parthenon mosque, demolished by Pittakis, is visible in the centre.

In 1843, Pittakis was appointed to the post of Ephor General of Antiquities, which had been unfilled since Ross's resignation in 1836. (Note: According to Kokkou, he was not formally named to the position until 12 January 1849 [O.S. 31 December 1848].) His salary, as recorded in 1859, (Note: The modern archaeological historians Yannis Galanakis and Stella Skaltsa, citing Petrakos 1982, p. 64, state that the Ephor General's salary remained reasonably similar until the end of the nineteenth century.) was 400 drachmas a month, slightly more than the 350 paid to a professor at the University of Athens and almost double the 250 previously paid to Ross. One of his first actions, in 1843, was to complete the demolition of the eighteenth-century Parthenon mosque, which had been partially destroyed during the War of Independence: Ross had begun this work in 1835, but been forced to stop by a lack of heavy equipment. Pittakis continued to curate Athens's archaeological collections, writing an 1843 guidebook in which he claimed that around 400 of the 615 objects exhibited in the Temple of Hephaestus had been collected "as a result of [his] endeavour and passion". He also continued to excavate on the Acropolis, completing in 1843–1844 with Rangavis the restoration of the Temple of Athena Nike, and uncovering two portions of the Parthenon frieze in 1845. He returned to the Temple of Athena Nike in 1846–1847 to install casts replacing parts of its frieze, which had been removed and taken to the British Museum.

In 1844, the prime minister, Kolettis – possibly encouraged by Rangavis – wrote a report to King Otto in which he criticised Pittakis for what he described as his negligent and unmethodical work, particularly on the Parthenon. Kolettis also condemned Pittakis's administration of the Archaeological Journal, which he claimed had made Greece "the laughing-stock of all archaeologists". The Journal had earlier been criticised in the German press for delays in its publication; in July 1843, its publication ceased altogether, and would not resume until 1852. (Note: Pittakis remained the Journal's editor, and wrote every article in the 1852 edition.)

One of Pittakis's priorities was to protect the antiquities on the Acropolis, which he had previously described as an "archaeological garden", from looting and damage. He hired watchmen to ensure that none of the site's scattered, fragmentary remains were picked up by visitors. As Ross had before him, Pittakis concentrated his efforts on those fragments that showed signs of carving, or which bore inscriptions: other pieces were often recycled as part of improvised repairs to the Acropolis's monuments, or sold to visiting tourists. Between 1847 and 1853, he arranged for archaeological fragments scattered around the site to be collected, fixed into plaster and built into so-called "walls" or "panels" (pinakes). He established additional collections of antiquities in the major monuments of the site, as well as in cisterns and cellars, most of which were in locked storerooms to which only he had keys, and to which nobody was permitted access except in his presence. A substantial problem was the habit of visitors, especially sailors from the harbour of Piraeus, of chipping away pieces from the ancient structures, particularly the Erechtheion: to combat this, Pittakis had the whole temple clad in a protective layer of stone. By 1850, there were ten secure locations on the Acropolis in which antiquities were stored, though scattered sculptural remains continued to be found around the site into the 1870s.

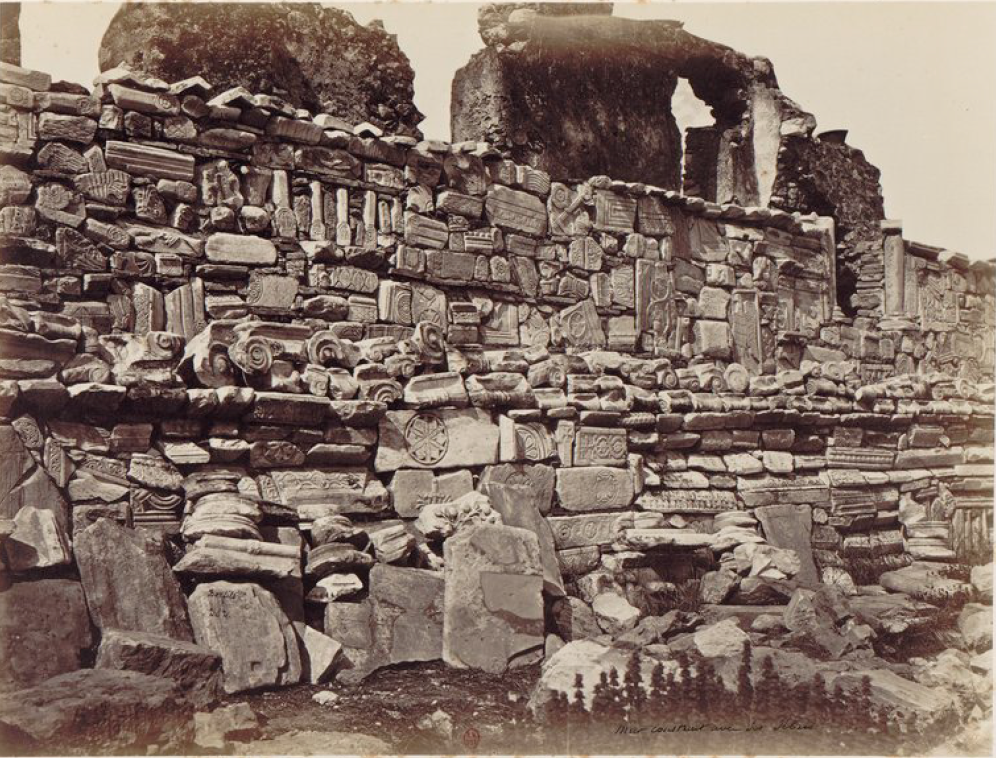
One of Pittakis's pinakes on the Acropolis, constructed from the fragmentary remains of various antiquities (here mostly Byzantine), photographed c. 1868–1875

From 1850, Pittakis undertook large-scale restoration work in and around the Propylaia. That year, he cleared and partially reconstructed the steps approaching the monument. Pittakis enlisted Charles Ernest Beulé, an archaeologist of the French School at Athens, to assist with the removal of medieval and modern structures from the remaining parts of the Propylaia in 1852. Beulé, against the prevailing scholarly opinion at the time, believed that Mnesikles, the architect of the Propylaia, had originally constructed a second gateway. He secured Pittakis's blessing as well as support from Alexandre de Forth-Rouen, the French ambassador to Greece, to investigate his hypothesis. On 4 May [O.S. 22 April], the excavators discovered additional steps leading towards the gate, and by 17 May [O.S. 5 May] it had become clear that they had found the edge of a fortified wall around the Acropolis, and within it a late Roman gateway, which became known as the Beulé Gate. The site was visited by King Otto and Queen Amalia, and the discovery made Beulé's scholarly reputation. Towards the end of the excavation, Beulé used explosives to blast through a particularly difficult block of mortar – a decision criticised by contemporary archaeologists, as well as the Greek newspapers, one of which had previously accused Beulé of wanting to blow up everything on the Acropolis. Pittakis, who had been watching the operation, was almost struck by a fragment of the debris which pierced his hat: reports circulated in the aftermath that he had been killed. In 1854, Pittakis reconstructed the western part of the podium of the pinakotheke on the Propylaia's north-eastern side, which was in danger of collapsing.

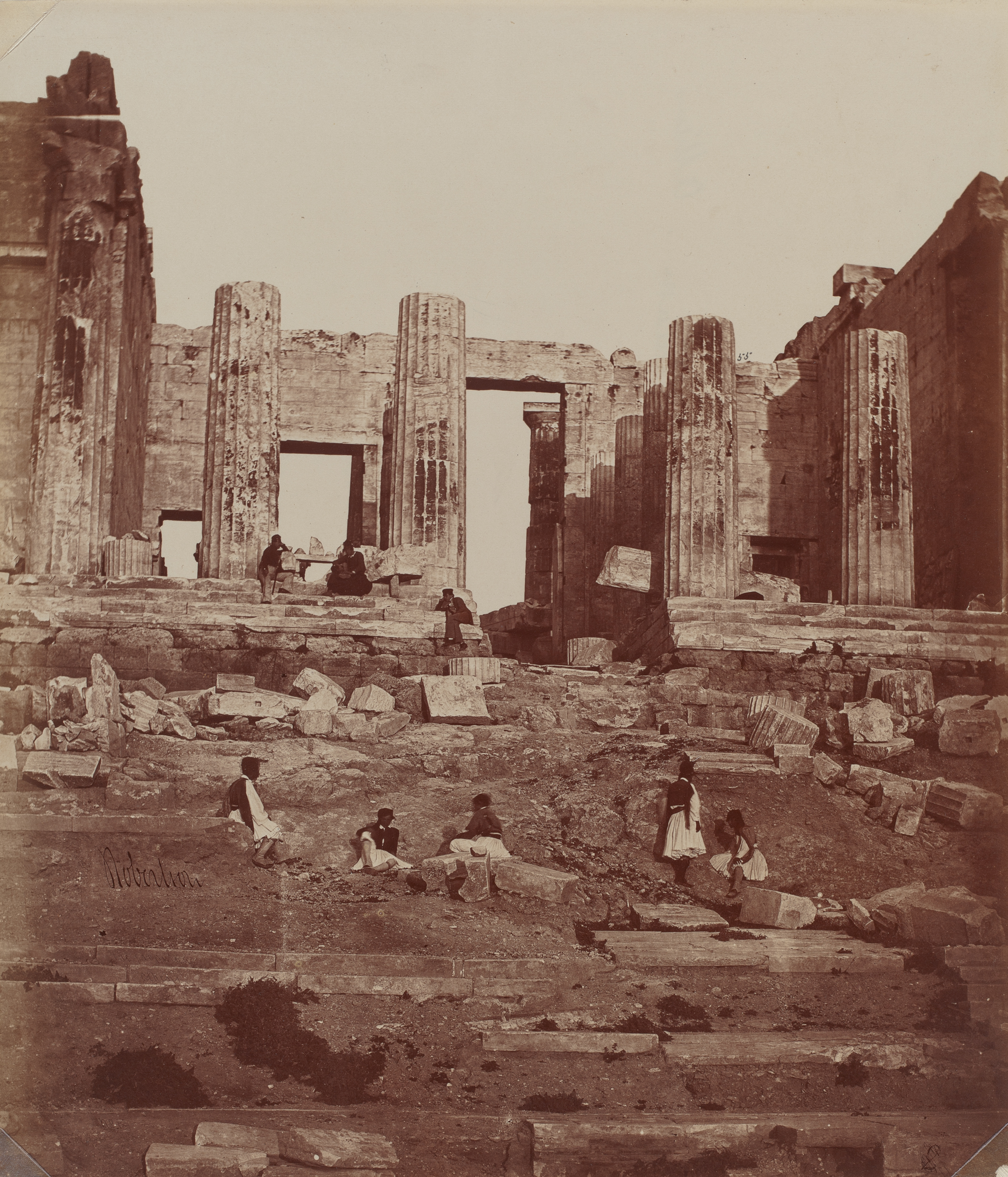
An 1857 photograph of the Propylaia, showing its state in the years immediately after Pittakis's restorations

During his time as Ephor General, Pittakis excavated on the island of Anafi, recording monuments and collecting inscriptions. He advocated for the demolition of the Frankish Tower, a medieval fortification built into the Propylaia, which would eventually be demolished in 1874. Between 1856 and 1860, he carried out further clearing on the Acropolis in preparation for the construction, which would eventually begin in 1865, of what became the Old Acropolis Museum. At this point, he considered the excavation of the Acropolis complete, since the excavations had reached bedrock in the 'main' area between the Parthenon, the Erechtheion and the Propylaia, and most of the post-classical structures on the site had been removed. He also excavated in Athens's lower town, including the Odeon of Herodes Atticus in 1848–1858, in which he found calcined remains of pieces of cedar wood, which have been taken as evidence for the odeon's original wooden roof. The excavations of the odeon uncovered a large bomb, which was interpreted as a remnant of the artillery fired by Venetian forces commanded by Francesco Morosini during his siege of the Acropolis in 1687.

In 1860, Pittakis edited his final edition of the Archaeological Journal, in which he claimed to have published a total of 4,158 inscriptions, "freely and for no compensation … merely moved by my yearning desire for the ancestral relics … [for] the common benefit and the dissemination to the ends of the world of every Greek letter, for the sake of Greek glory". (Note: Quoted and translated in Papazarkadas 2014, p. 405)

The later part of Pittakis's career as Ephor General saw the discovery, in 1861, of the Kerameikos cemetery; the excavations which took part here under Pittakis have been described as "random". His health began to fail in 1863; he wrote to the Minister of Education, who oversaw his work, on 29 July [O.S. 17 July], asking for a twenty-day leave of absence. He wrote again on 23 September [O.S. 11 September] to say that he was no longer physically able to climb the Acropolis of Athens, which he claimed to have done up to four times a day for the past thirty-three years. Finally, on 22 October [O.S. 10 October], he wrote to request an office facing the sun, complaining that his office, at the back of the ministry building, was "full of impurities and stench" and that he would not be able to work in it through the winter, "if God grant[ed him] to live out the year". Parts of this final letter are illegible owing to Pittakis's increasing weakness and deteriorating handwriting.

Pittakis died in Athens on 4 November [O.S. 23 October] 1863. Rangavis, with whom he had quarrelled over his approach to restorations and over his handling of the Naval Records affair, delivered the eulogy at his funeral, in which he praised Pittakis's devotion to the classical past and did much to establish his reputation as a patriot and protector of Greece's antiquities. He was succeeded as Ephor General by Efstratiadis, with whom he had worked on the excavation of the Psoma House and on the committee reporting on the Erechtheion. Pittakis's son, a judge by the name of Plato, published Rangavis's eulogy alongside another offered by Philippos Ioannou, who, along with Rangavis, had been Pittakis's comrade in the Philiki Hetaireia.

== Nationalism ==
As a young man, Pittakis was a member of the nationalist Philiki Hetaireia, and he expressed Greek nationalist views throughout his life. He described his activities in excavating and conserving ancient Greek monuments as "sacred work". The Archaeological Society of Athens, which he helped to found and in which he played a leading role until 1859, has been described as "an intransigent ideological exponent of pure classicism throughout the 19th century", and as both "elitist" and "archaistic". Pittakis's work, along with nineteenth-century Greek archaeology more generally, has been criticised for privileging classical material over that of later periods, particularly from the Byzantine era (c. 500 – c. 1492). (Note: Mackridge 2012, p. 39. For the dates of Byzantine Greece, a matter of scholarly disagreement and judgement, see Shepard 2010, pp. 21–26.) More than half of Athens's churches which stood in 1830 were demolished during the nineteenth century, many by Pittakis, often in order to clear the view of ancient monuments or to allow the excavation of further ancient remains beneath them.

Whoever at any time ascended that sacred hill was almost certain to meet the indefatigable archaeological guard, or his inscriptions, pilgrims and the students of his mysteries … Strangers, who came from all over the earth as pious pilgrims to the hill of the ancient miracles, ascending by the thousands every year, always found there among them the vigilant ephor, and used to associate him with the relics of those ancients.
Rangavis's eulogy for Pittakis, 1863.

Reflecting in 1836 on his experience of archaeology before the War of Independence, he wrote of his "fear of the Turks", and the haste with which he was forced to carry out his informal archaeological work on the Acropolis during the occupation. In support of his excavations of the Athenian agora in the area of Vrysaki, Pittakis claimed that all but sixty houses in Athens had been destroyed by the Turks, a figure questioned by modern studies. Pittakis's accounts of the Turks' indifferent or destructive attitude to antiquities have been interpreted as part of a commonplace in pre-revolutionary Greece, where the Ottomans were presented as religious zealots liable to destroy Greek monuments. This narrative has been called "overstated" in modern times, but identified as a "colonial tool" used in the nineteenth century to justify the removal of antiquities to European collections and, after independence, to advocate for the demolition of Ottoman remains by presenting them as of little value compared with what were considered the "authentic" classical remains beneath them.

In his 1835 guide to Athens's antiquities, Pittakis wrote of his hope that Greece would be able to reclaim the Parthenon sculptures taken by Elgin, which he described as "the masterpieces of [our] ancestors." (Note: St. Clair 1998, p. 333, quoting Pittakis 1835, p. 379.) From 1836 onwards, he continually obstructed and frustrated British efforts to obtain plaster casts of the Parthenon sculptures still stored on the Acropolis, which Charles Newton, the Keeper of the British Museum, complained had left the sculptures there "as leaves torn out of a manuscript are to the book itself."

=== Fallmerayer controversy ===
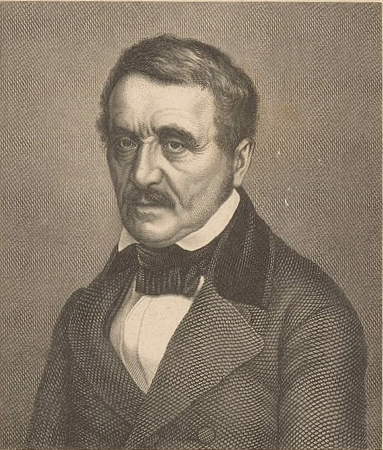
Portrait of Fallmerayer, c. 1840 – c. 1855

In 1830, the Tyrolean scholar Jakob Philipp Fallmerayer published History of the Morea Peninsula During the Middle Ages, (Note: German: Geschichte der Halbinsel Morea während des Mittelalters.) in which he argued that the Greek population had been totally replaced during the early medieval period through Slavic and Albanian migration. He characterised the modern Greek population as the descendants of these migrants, and argued that the Greek language had only persisted as a result of outsiders learning Greek from the local Byzantine rulers, and had consequently become "Slavicised". Fallmerayer's ideas challenged the foundations of Greek national identity: under the Ottoman Empire, educated Greeks had used their claim of kinship with the ancient Greek past to establish their distinction from other Orthodox populations within the Ottoman Balkans. This kinship was crucial to the ideological foundation of the Greek War of Independence, where the support of western philhellenes for the Greek cause had been predicated upon what the academic Toby Lee has described as "an assumed (or actively constructed) continuity between the present-day Greeks ... and the glorious cultural and political history of ancient Greece." According to Fallmerayer, by contrast, "only a romantic, eager imagination [could] still dream of a revival in our days of the ancient Hellenes with their Sophocleses and Platos", (Note: Quoted in Fine 1991, p. 60) and support for the Greek state in western Europe could achieve nothing but the strengthening of Slavic Russia, widely seen as a threat to the other European Great Powers.

Fallmerayer's ideas gained some traction in western Europe, and were influential with King Otto, but created what has been called "an urgent need to confront [them]" among Greek intellectuals. Dissenting views were published within Greece and by philhellenes abroad, combining into a long-running and acrimonious response to Fallmerayer's work. When Fallmerayer visited Athens, he found that he had become widely hated; he was called a "national enemy", a "slanderer", an "ignoramus" and a "madman". Other western-European scholars challenged Fallmerayer's thesis, such as the German historian Johann Wilhelm Zinkeisen, who published what has been described as "a complete rebuttal" of Fallmerayer's claims. (Note: Mishkova 2015, p. 144. For the Greek and wider reaction to Fallmerayer's publications, see Herzfeld 2020, pp. 77–78.) In 1834, Fallmerayer visited Athens in search of manuscripts related to his theories. Pittakis has been widely accused of forging a spurious manuscript, known as the Anargyroi Chronicle, which appeared to support Fallmerayer's hypothesis and which Pittakis showed to him: when Fallmerayer included it in his publication of his ideas, he was ridiculed by the scholarly community and his theory largely rejected. (Note: The accusations are reported as fact by the Greek historian Georgios Veloudis and the archaeological and cultural historian Yannis Hamilakis, though Pittakis denied them, and Petrakos considers them to be false.) In 1843, the Greek historian Konstantinos Paparrigopoulos published a reply, criticising Fallmerayer's reliance on sources from comparatively late historical periods, such as the Chronicle of Monemvasia, a controversial manuscript whose narrative was likely composed between the tenth and fourteenth centuries.

In 1852, Pittakis published a series of articles entitled "Materials to Be Used to Prove that the Current Inhabitants of Greece are Descendants of the Ancient Greeks". In these papers, he attempted to find analogues in classical literary sources for popular phrases and practices of his own time. These articles have been criticised for assuming that their conclusion was self-evident, and offering little analysis or criticism of the sources beyond a face-value reading. Fallmerayer's theory of discontinuity, however, was considered discredited both in Greek and western-European historiography by the end of the nineteenth century. (Note: Mishkova 2015, p. 150. For modern views on the continuity of "Greek civilisation", see Curta 2011, pp. 7–8, 292.) Modern historians have described Fallmerayer's views as racist, and his scholarship as "uneven at best", even by the standards of his time, for its "extensive use of special pleading and blank assertion".

== Legacy ==
The reception of Pittakis's work and impact on Greek archaeology has been polarised. In his own lifetime, he was honoured by the French Académie des Beaux-Arts, which granted him the title of corresponding member in 1853. He has been praised as the first Greek scholar to make substantial use of epigraphy in reconstructing the classical past, for his efforts in preserving objects and the texts of inscriptions which would otherwise have been lost, and for his energetic approach to the excavation and conservation of Greece's ancient monuments. His published work remains an important source for the study of Athenian history and epigraphy. Papazarkadas has suggested that Pittakis may have published more inscriptions than any other epigrapher in history, while Petrakos has credited him (along with Rangavis and Andreas Moustoxydis) as being one of only three Greeks of the mid-nineteenth century who understood the discipline of archaeology in its modern sense. His appointment has also been identified as a major factor in placing control the field of Greek archaeology into the hands of Greeks, rather than the northern-European scholars who had dominated it before 1836.

At the same time, Pittakis's epigraphical work has been criticised for its lack of scholarly rigour, for Pittakis's errors in his knowledge of historical and literary sources, and for the inaccuracy with which he reconstructed or interpreted certain texts. His reconstructions of Athenian monuments have been criticised for their haphazard methods, and for the licence with which Pittakis removed post-classical structures and reorganised ancient remains. Doubts have also been raised as to Pittakis's scholarly integrity, particularly in matters pertaining to Greek nationalism.

In November 2013, a colloquium in Pittakis's memory was held at the Epigraphical Museum in Athens, entitled "Upon a White Stone". (Note: Greek: Επί πέτρας λευκής, romanized: Epi Petras Lefkis.)

=== Criticism ===
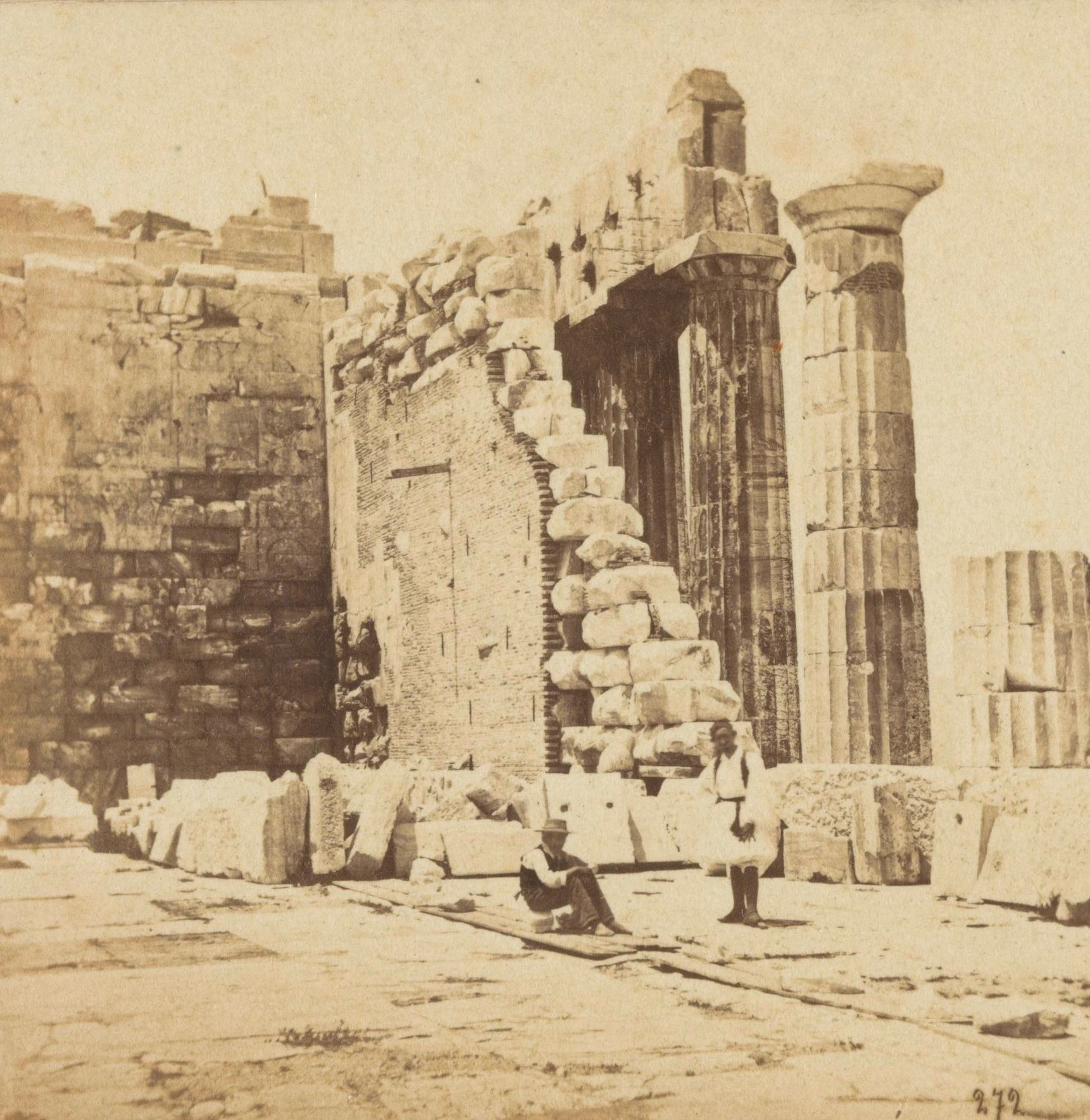
Photograph taken inside the Parthenon between 1857 and 1863; Pittakis's restorations can be seen on the walls and column drums

Pittakis's lack of philological education and theoretical archaeological knowledge limited the effectiveness of his scholarship and restorations. His work has been described as "empirical" rather than systematic, and was often characterised by a failure to keep records of what he had removed, particularly of remains later than the classical period. In particular, Ludwig Ross criticised his clearing work in the Propylaia for failing to make any record of the later buildings he demolished. He was further criticised in the contemporary press for his practice of building pinakes by setting various antiquities into plaster, which often broke up ensembles or presented artefacts of different periods and provenances together, and by British contemporaries for his practice of storing antiquities away from public view, denying most scholars access to them. His unsystematic record-keeping meant that he often published the same object or inscription multiple times, sometimes giving contradictory accounts of the date and place of its discovery, or recorded finds without giving their proper context.

Pittakis's collaborator, Alexandros Rizos Rangavis, later described his approach to restoration as "unmethodical and by chance", and it was generally poorly received by both Greek and foreign observers. He has been criticised for undertaking restoration work with little prior study or documentation of the buildings, and for reconstructing both the Parthenon and the Erechtheion to place better-preserved items of masonry in more prominent positions, regardless of the original construction. His use of modern bricks where anastylosis could not be carried out as has been described as "amateurish". During his reconstruction of the Parthenon, he filled missing portions of the Doric columns with cylindrical brickwork, ignoring the fluting characteristic of the style. The archaeological historian Fani Mallouchou-Tufano has described his restorative work as characterised by "enthusiasm … innocence, naivity and ignorance", pointing to his use of improvised material, including tree trunks, to restore the orthostates of the Erechtheion, as well as to a story reported by Rangavis of Pittakis's improvised repair to a column of the Propylaia, using a large hand saw, which almost caused the collapse of the structure and left the saw itself stuck inside the column until its removal in 2003. The negative reaction to his restorations, particularly in the Parthenon and Erechtheion, has been credited with inspiring the significant changes in approach adopted when the next major phase of the Acropolis's reconstruction began at the end of the nineteenth century, under Nikolaos Balanos. Many of Pittakis's restorations were reverted during subsequent phases of conservation on the site.

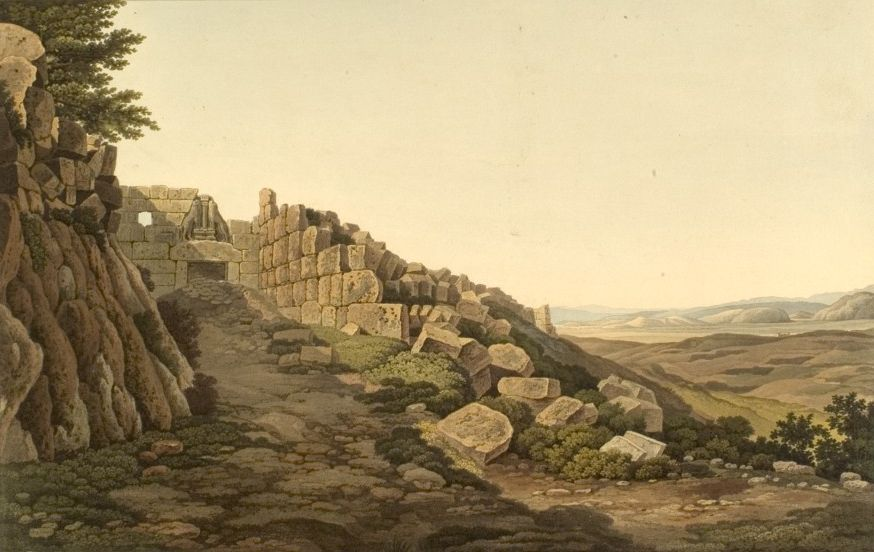
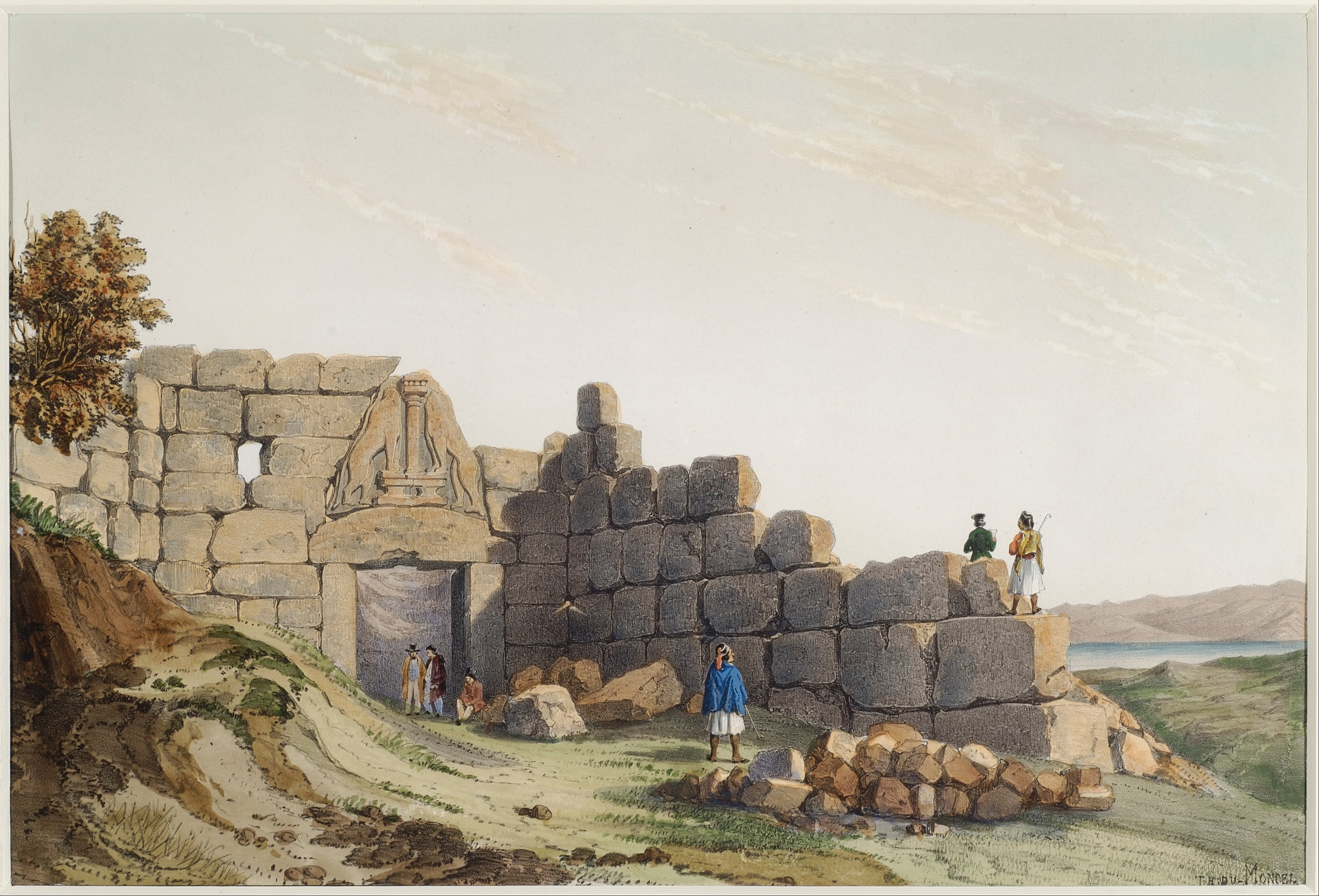
Two paintings showing the effect of Pittakis's clearing of the Lion Gate at Mycenae: left, by Edward Dodwell in 1821, before Pittakis's 1841 intervention; right, by Théodose du Moncel in 1845

The later archaeologist of Mycenae, Spyridon Iakovidis, described Pittakis's work at the site as "half-hearted" in comparison to the excavations of Heinrich Schliemann and Christos Tsountas later in the century. His epigraphic publications have been unfavourably compared with the contemporary work of Rangavis, who provided detailed information about the find-spot of each inscription, as well as a full transliteration and French translation. Rangavis also accused him of hiding inscriptions so that he could not study them; Pittakis, meanwhile, accused Rangavis of failing to acknowledge his role in the discovery of inscriptions that the latter had published.

Nikolaos Papazarkadas has argued that many criticisms of Pittakis's integrity date to his feud with Ross, particularly the circumstances of the latter's resignation in 1836, and that their prominence in modern assessments of Pittakis reflects the uncritical repetition by scholars of unfounded nineteenth-century accusations against him. It was during this conflict that Böckh, Ross and Pittakis's mutual collaborator as the editor of the Corpus Inscriptionum Graecorum, accused Pittakis of breaking inscriptions into multiple pieces, or submitting the same inscription to him multiple times with false information as to its provenance, so as to be paid twice for finding it.

== Bibliography ==
- Archaeological Society of Athens (2005). Ίδρυση [Establishment] (in Greek). Archived from the original on 24 April 2023.
- Archaeological Society of Athens (2019). "'Archaiologike Ephemeris' (ΑΕ)". Archived from the original on 13 May 2023.
- Archaeological Society of Athens (2020a). Γραμματειες Σκαρλατου Βυζαντιου (1851–1852) και Κυριακου Πιττακη (1852–1859) [Secretariat of Skarlatos Byzantios (1851–1852) and Kyriakos Pittakis (1852–1859)] (PDF) (in Greek). Archived from the original (PDF) on 16 July 2020.
- Archaeological Society of Athens (2020b). Πιττάκης Kυριακός (1798–1863) [Pittakis Kyriakos (1798–1863)] (PDF) (in Greek). Archived from the original (PDF) on 1 November 2021.
- Arnaoutoglou, Ilias (2008). "Διὰ δόξαν ἐκείνων καὶ κλέος του ἔθνους: The Philomousos Society of Athens and Antiquities". The Province Strikes Back: Imperial Dynamics in the Eastern Mediterranean. Helsinki: Finnish Institute at Athens. pp. 201–214. ISBN 978-951-98806-8-6.
- Athanassoglou-Kallmyer, Nina (2008). "Excavating Greece: Classicism between Empire and Nation in Nineteenth-Century Europe". Nineteenth-Century Art Worldwide. 7 (2). ISSN 1543-1002. Archived from the original on 17 August 2022.
- Athanassopoulou, Effie F. (2002). "An 'Ancient' Landscape: European Ideals, Archaeology, and Nation Building in Early Modern Greece". Journal of Modern Greek Studies. 20 (2): 273–305. doi:10.1353/mgs.2002.0018. ISSN 1086-3265. S2CID 143979066.
- Auernheimer, Gustav (1998). "Fallmerayer, Huntington und die Diskussion um die neugriechische Identität". Comparative Southeast European Studies. 47 (1–2): 1–17. doi:10.1515/soeu-1998-471-203. ISSN 2701-8202.
- Baelen, Jean (1958). "La porte Beulé et le prix de poésie de 1854" [The Beulé Gate and the 1854 Poetry Prize]. Bulletin de l'Association Guillaume Budé (in French). 1 (2): 92–116. doi:10.3406/bude.1958.3823. ISSN 2275-5160.
- Beard, Mary (2010). The Parthenon. London: Profile Books. ISBN 978-1-84668-349-7.
- Beresford, James (2016). "'Alchemy on the Acropolis: Turning Ancient Lead into Restitutionist Gold". The Historical Journal. 59 (3): 903–926. doi:10.1017/S0018246X15000242. ISSN 1469-5103. S2CID 163841256.
- Bikelas, Demetrius (1868). "Statistics of the Kingdom of Greece". Journal of the Statistical Society of London. 31 (3): 265–298. doi:10.2307/2338853. ISSN 0959-5341. JSTOR 2338853.
- Buxton Whalley (1851). "A Visit to the 'Maid of Athens'". Bentley's Miscellany. Vol. 30. London. pp. 67–68. ISSN 1751-8466.
- Camp, John M. (2001). The Archaeology of Athens. New Haven: Yale University Press. ISBN 978-0-300-13815-3.
- Casanaki, Maria; Mallouchou, Fani (1985). "Interventions on the Acropolis: 1833–1975". The Acropolis at Athens: Conservation, Restoration and Research 1975–1983. Athens: ESMA. pp. 12–20. OL 13958685M.
- Chaniotis, Angelos (1 November 2021). Ο άνθρωπος που έδωσε όνομα στην Οδό Πιττάκη [The person who gave his name to Pittakis Street] (in Greek). Lifo.
- Cohen, Elizabeth (2018). "Explosions and Expulsions in Ottoman Athens: A Heritage Perspective on the Temple of Olympian Zeus". International Journal of Islamic Architecture. 7 (1): 85–106. doi:10.1386/ijia.7.1.85_1. ISSN 2045-5909. Archived from the original (PDF) on 23 December 2022.
- Costaki, Lena (2021). "Urban Archaeology: Discovering the Ancient City". In Neils, Jenifer; Rogers, Dylan K. (eds.). The Cambridge Companion to Ancient Athens. Cambridge: Cambridge University Press. pp. 462–481. doi:10.1017/9781108614054. ISBN 978-1-108-61405-4. S2CID 243691800.
- Constantakopoulou, Christy (2008). "Reviewed Work(s): Ludwig Ross und Griechenland. Akten des Internationalen Kolloquiums, Athen, 2.–3. Oktober 2002 = Ludwig Ross και η Ελλάδα. Πρακτικά του Διεθνούς συνεδρίου, Αθήνα, 2–3 Οκτοβρίου 2002 by H.R. GOETTE and O. PALAGIA". The Journal of Hellenic Studies. 128: 297. doi:10.1017/S0075426900001488. ISSN 2041-4099. JSTOR 40651866.
- Curta, Florin (2011). The Edinburgh History of the Greeks, c. 500 to 1050. Edinburgh: Edinburgh University Press. ISBN 978-0-7486-4489-6.
- Dickins, Guy (2014) [1912]. Catalogue of the Acropolis Museum: Volume 1, Archaic Sculpture. Cambridge: Cambridge University Press. ISBN 978-1-107-41801-1.
- Dumont, Sylvie (2020). Vrysaki: A Neighborhood Lost in the Search for the Athenian Agora. Athens: American School of Classical Studies at Athens. ISBN 978-1-62139-037-4.
- Dyer, Thomas Henry (1873). Ancient Athens: Its History, Topography, and Remains. London: Bell and Daldy. OCLC 910991294.
- Dyson, Stephen L. (2008). In Pursuit of Ancient Pasts: A History of Classical Archaeology in the Nineteenth and Twentieth Centuries. New Haven: Yale University Press. ISBN 978-0-300-13497-1.
- Efthymiou, Maria D. (2021). "Athens". In Kitromilides, Paschalis M.; Tsoukalas, Constantinos (eds.). The Greek Revolution: A Critical Dictionary. Cambridge, MA: Harvard University Press. pp. 166–177. ISBN 978-0-674-25932-4.
- Epigraphic Museum of Athens (19 February 2021). "Κυριακός Πιττάκης (1798–1863)". Archived from the original on 8 December 2022.
- Fine, John V.A. (1991) [1983]. The Early Medieval Balkans: A Critical Survey from the Sixth to the Late Twelfth Century. Ann Arbor: University of Michigan Press. ISBN 978-0-472-08149-3.
- Förster, Ludwig (1854). "Reisen in Italien, Griechenland und der Levant" [Journeys in Italy, Greece and the Levant]. Notizblatt der Allgeimeinen Bauzeitung (in German). Vienna: 21–26. ISSN 0002-5801. Archived from the original on 20 December 2022.
- Fowden, Elizabeth Key (2018). "The Parthenon, Pericles and King Solomon: A Case Study of Ottoman Archaeological Imagination in Greece". Byzantine and Modern Greek Studies. 42 (2): 261–274. doi:10.1017/byz.2018.8. ISSN 1749-625X. S2CID 165918625.
- Gabrielsen, Vincent (2014). "The Piraeus and the Athenian Navy: Recent Archaeological and Historical Advances". Proceedings of the Danish Institute at Athens. 4: 37–48. ISSN 2241-9195. Archived from the original on 22 December 2022.
- Galanakis, Yannis; Nowak-Kemp, Malgosia (2013). "Ancient Greek Skulls in the Oxford University Museum, Part II: The Rhousopoulos-Rolleston Correspondence". Journal of the History of Collections. 25 (1): 1–17. doi:10.1093/jhc/fhq040. ISSN 1477-8564.
- Galanakis, Yannis; Skaltsa, Stella (2012). "Tomb Robbers, Art Dealers, and a Dikast's Pinakion from an Athenian Grave". Hesperia. 81 (4): 619–653. doi:10.2972/hesperia.81.4.0619. ISSN 1553-5622. JSTOR 10.2972/hesperia.81.4.0619. S2CID 163987166.
- Grant, Michael (1994). The Antonines: The Roman Empire in Transition. Abingdon: Taylor and Francis. ISBN 978-1-317-97211-2.
- Greenberg, Raphael; Hamilakis, Yannis (2022). Archaeology, Nation, and Race: Confronting the Past, Decolonizing the Future in Greece and Israel. Cambridge: Cambridge University Press. ISBN 978-1-009-16023-0.
- Hamilakis, Yannis; Yalouri, Eleana (1999). "Sacralising the Past: Cults of Archaeology in Modern Greece". Archaeological Dialogues. 6 (2): 115–135. doi:10.1017/S138020380000146X. ISSN 1478-2294. S2CID 145214423.
- Hamilakis, Yannis (2007). The Nation and Its Ruins: Antiquity, Archaeology, and National Imagination in Greece. Oxford: Oxford University Press. ISBN 978-0-19-923038-9.
- Haugsted, Ida (1996). Dream and Reality: Danish Antiquaries, Architects and Artists in Greece. London: Archetype Publications. ISBN 978-1-873132-75-3.
- Hellmann, Marie-Christine; Fraisse, Phillipe; Jacques, Annie (1982). Paris-Rome-Athens: Travels in Greece by French Architects in the Nineteenth and Twentieth centuries [Exhibition Catalogue]. Houston: University of Texas Press. ISBN 978-0-89090-032-1.
- Helm, Christoph (2000). "Ludwig Ross und seine Bedeutung für die klassischen Altertumswissenschaften" [Ludwig Ross and his Importance for Classical Studies]. In Kunze, Max (ed.). Akzidenzen 12: Flugblätter der Winckelmann-Gesellschaft (PDF) (in German). Stendal: Winckelmann-Gesellschaft. pp. 3–24. ISBN 3-910060-38-2. OCLC 1249640687. Archived from the original (PDF) on 10 February 2020.
- Herzfeld, Michael (2020) [1982]. Ours Once More: Folklore, Ideology, and the Making of Modern Greece. New York: Berghahn. ISBN 978-1-78920-722-4.
- Iakovidis, Spyridon (2005). "Mycenae: Past Achievements, Present Tasks and Future Prospects". Bulletin of the Institute of Classical Studies. 48: 163–171. doi:10.1111/j.2041-5370.2005.tb00259.x. ISSN 2041-5370. JSTOR 43646724.
- Jenkins, Ian (1990). "Acquisition and Supply of Casts of the Parthenon Sculptures by the British Museum, 1835–1939". The Annual of the British School at Athens. 85: 89–114. doi:10.1017/S0068245400015598. ISSN 2045-2403. JSTOR 30102843. S2CID 193237324.
- Jenkins, Romilly (1953). "Byron's Maid of Athens: Her Family and Surroundings. By C. G. Brouzas. Pp. 65, 4 pll. Philological Papers (Volume 7), West Virginia University Bulletin, Series 49, No. 12–VI, June, 1949". The Journal of Hellenic Studies. 73: 200. doi:10.2307/628366. ISSN 2041-4099. JSTOR 628366. S2CID 161447716.
- Junker, Klaus (1995). "Ludwig Ross und die Publikation seiner Ausgrabungen auf der Athener Akropolis" [Ludwig Ross and the Publication of his Excavations on the Acropolis of Athens]. Archäologischer Anzeiger (in German): 755–762. ISSN 2510-4713.
- Kaldellis, Anthony (2009). The Christian Parthenon: Classicism and Pilgrimage in Byzantine Athens. Cambridge: Cambridge University Press. ISBN 978-0-521-88228-6.
- Kiminas, Demetrius (2009). The Ecumenical Patriarchate. San Bernardino: The Borgo Press. ISBN 978-1-4344-5876-6.
- Kokkou, Angeliki (2009) [1977]. Η μέριμνα για τις αρχαιότητες στην Ελλάδα και η δημιουργία των πρώτων μουσείων [The Attitudes Towards Antiquities in Greece and the Founding of the First Museums] (in Greek). Athens: Kapon Editions. ISBN 978-960-6878-11-4.
- Koliopoulos, John S.; Veremis, Thanos M. (2009). Modern Greece: A History Since 1821. Chichester: Wiley. ISBN 978-1-4443-1483-0.
- Lambrinou, Lena (2012). "The Parthenon North Side". In Bouras, Charalambos; Ioannidou, Maria; Jenkins, Ian (eds.). Acropolis Restored. London: The British Museum Press. pp. 49–56. ISBN 978-0-86159-187-9.
- Lambrinou, Lena (2016). "Ancient Ruins and Their Preservation: The Case Study of the Parthenon's East Porch". In Miles, Margaret (ed.). A Companion to Greek Architecture. Oxford: Wiley. pp. 526–545. ISBN 978-1-4443-3599-6.
- Lee, Toby (2020). The Public Life of Cinema: Conflict and Collectivity in Austerity Greece. Oakland: University of California Press. ISBN 978-0-520-37902-2.
- Mackridge, Peter (2012). "The Heritages of the Modern Greeks" (PDF). British Academy Review. 19: 33–41. ISSN 2047-1874. Archived from the original (PDF) on 27 January 2023.
- Mallouchou-Tufano, Fani (1994). "The History of Interventions on the Acropolis". In Economakis, Richard (ed.). Acropolis Restoration: The CCAM Interventions. Athens: Academy Editions. pp. 69–85. ISBN 978-1-85490-344-0.
- Mallouchou-Tufano, Fani (1998). Η Αναστήλωση των αρχαίων μνημείων στη νεώτερη Ελλάδα (1834–1939) [The Restoration of Ancient Monuments in Modern Greece (1834–1939)] (in Greek). Athens: Archaeological Society of Athens. ISBN 978-960-7036-78-0.
- Mallouchou-Tufano, Fani (2007). "The Vicissitudes of the Athenian Acropolis in the Nineteenth Century: From Castle to Monument". In Valavanis, Panos (ed.). Great Moments in Greek Archaeology. Athens: Kapon Press. pp. 36–57. ISBN 978-0-89236-910-2.
- Maniatea, Tonia (19 November 2022). Ειδικο Θεμα: Κυριακός Πιττάκης, ο πρώτος αυτοδίδακτος Έλληνας αρχαιολόγος [Special Topic: Kyriakos Pittakis, the First Self-Taught Greek Archaeologist] (in Greek). Athens-Macedonian News Agency. Archived from the original on 1 February 2023.
- Matthiou, Angelos; Pallis, Georgios, eds. (2021). Επί πέτρας λευκής. Πρακτικά Συμποσίου εις μνήμην Κυριακού Σ. Πιττάκη [Upon a White Stone: Proceedings of a Symposium in Memory of Kyriakos S. Pittakis] (in Greek). Athens: Greek Epigraphical Society. ISBN 978-618-5459-04-8.
- Merry, Bruce (2004). "Chronicle of Anthimos". Encyclopedia of Modern Greek Literature. Westport, Connecticut: Greenwood Press. p. 74. ISBN 978-0-313-30813-0.
- Mishkova, Diana (2015). "The Afterlife of a Commonwealth: Narratives of Byzantium in the National Historiographies of Greece, Bulgaria, Serbia and Romania". In Daskalov, Roumen; Vezenkov, Alexander (eds.). Entangled Histories of the Balkans: Volume 3: Shared Pasts, Disputed Legacies. Leiden and Boston: Brill. pp. 118–273. ISBN 978-90-04-29036-5.
- Moore, Dudley; Rowlands, Edward; Karadimas, Nektarios (2014). In Search of Agamemnon: Early Travellers to Mycenae. Newcastle-upon-Tyne: Cambridge Scholars Press. ISBN 978-1-4438-5776-5.
- Neville, Leonora (2018). Guide to Byzantine Historical Writing. Cambridge: Cambridge University Press. doi:10.1017/9781139626880. ISBN 978-1-139-62688-0.
- Ousterhout, Robert (2005). "'Bestride the Very Peak of Heaven': The Parthenon After Antiquity". In Neils, Jennifer (ed.). The Parthenon: From Antiquity to the Present. Cambridge: Cambridge University Press. pp. 293–329. ISBN 978-0-521-82093-6.
- Pantos, Petros (2008). Αρχείο Ελλήνων Λογοτεχνών: Φίλιππος Ιωάννου [Archive of Greek Writers: Philippos Ioannou] (in Greek). Archived from the original on 19 March 2023.
- Papadopoulos, Georgios (2021). "Οι έρευνες του Κ. Σ. Πιττάκη στην Σαλαμίνα". In Matthiou, Angelos; Pallis, Georgios (eds.). Επί πέτρας λευκής. Πρακτικά Συμποσίου εις μνήμην Κυριακού Σ. Πιττάκη [Light upon the Stones: Proceedings of a Conference in Memory of Kyriakos S. Pittakis] (in Greek). Athens: Greek Epigraphical Society. pp. 115–132. ISBN 978-618-5459-04-8.
- Papazarkadas, Nikolaos (2014). "Epigraphy in Early Modern Greece". Journal of the History of Collections. 26 (3): 399–412. doi:10.1093/jhc/fhu018. ISSN 1477-8564.
- Petrakos, Vasileios (1982). Δοκίµιο για την αρχαιολογική νοµοθεσία [Essay on Archaeological Legislation] (in Greek). Athens: Archaeological Resources and Expropriations Fund (Ταμείο Αρχαιολογικών Πόρων και Απαλλοτριώσεων). OL 47773078M.
- Petrakos, Vasileios (1987). Η Εν Αθήναις Αρχαιολογική Εταιρεία: η ιστορία των 150 χρόνων της [The Archaeological Society of Athens: The History of its 150 Years] (in Greek). Athens: Archaeological Society of Athens. OL 47767071M.
- Petrakos, Vasileios (1989). Παρωχημένη ἐπικαιρότης (Ὁ Κυριακὸς Σ. Πιττάκης καὶ τὰ ἀρχαῖα τῆς ᾿Ελλάδος) [Out of Date (Kyriakos S. Pittakis and the Antiquities of Greece] (PDF). Mentor (in Greek). 6: 22–26. ISSN 1105-1205. Archived from the original (PDF) on 8 January 2022.
- Petrakos, Vasileios (1993). Βιβλιογραφία περί του Κ.Σ. Πιττάκη [Bibliography on K.S. Pittakis] (PDF). Mentor (in Greek). 27: 126–127. ISSN 1105-7181. Archived from the original (PDF) on 22 September 2022.
- Petrakos, Vasileios (2004). Η απαρχή της ελληνικής αρχαιολογίας και η ίδρυση της Αρχαιολογικής Εταιρείας [The Beginning of Greek Archaeology and the Foundation of the Archaeological Society] (PDF). Mentor (in Greek). 73: 111–220. ISSN 1105-1205. Archived from the original (PDF) on 22 September 2022.
- Petrakos, Vasileios (2007). "The Stages of Greek Archaeology". In Valavanis, Panos (ed.). Great Moments in Greek Archaeology. Athens: Kapon Press. pp. 16–35. ISBN 978-0-89236-910-2.
- Petrakos, Vasileios (2011). Η εν Αθήναις Αρχαιολογική Εταιρεία. Οι Αρχαιολόγοι και οι Ανασκαφές 1837–2011 (Κατάλογος Εκθέσεως) [The Archaeological Society of Athens. The Archaeologists and the Excavations 1837–2011 (Exhibition Catalogue)] (in Greek). Athens: Archaeological Society of Athens. ISBN 978-960-8145-86-3.
- Petrakos, Vasileios (2013). Πρόχειρον αρχαιολογικόν 1828–2012: Μέρος Ι: Χρονογραφικό [Archaeological Handbook 1828–2012: Part 1: Chronological] (PDF) (in Greek). Athens: Archaeological Society of Athens. ISBN 978-618-5047-00-9. Archived from the original (PDF) on 5 October 2022.
- Pittakis, Kyriakos (1835). L'ancienne Athènes ou la description des antiquités d'Athènes [Ancient Athens, or the Description of the Antiquities of Athens] (in French). Athens: M.E. Antoniades. OCLC 10216999.
- Pittakis, Kyriakos, ed. (1852). "Archaeological Journal" (PDF). Archaeological Journal (in Greek). 31. ISSN 2241-5041. Archived from the original (PDF) on 22 September 2022.
- Pittakis, Kyriakos (1858). Περὶ Θεάτρου Ἠρώδου τοῦ Ἀττικοῦ [On the Theatre of Herodes Atticus] (PDF). Αρχαιολογική Εφημερίς (in Greek): 1707–1714. ISSN 2241-5041. Archived from the original (PDF) on 7 January 2022.
- Pizanias, Petros T. (2020). The Making of the Modern Greeks: 1400–1820. Newcastle-upon-Tyne: Cambridge Scholars Publishing. ISBN 978-1-5275-6248-6.
- Plantzos, Dimitris (2008). "Time and the Antique: Linear Causality and the Greek Art Narrative". In Damaskos, Dimitris; Plantzos, Dimitris Plantzos (eds.). A Singular Antiquity: Archaeology and Hellenic Identity in Twentieth-Century Greece. Athens: Benaki Museum. pp. 253–272. ISBN 978-960-8347-96-0.
- Plantzos, Dimitris (2014). "Dead Archaeologists, Buried Gods: Archaeology as an Agent of Modernity in Greece". In Tziovas, Dimitris (ed.). Re-imagining the Past: Antiquity and Modern Greek Culture. Oxford: Oxford University Press. pp. 147–164. ISBN 978-0-19-967275-2.
- Schmalz, Geoffrey (2006). "The Athenian Prytaneion Discovered?". Hesperia: The Journal of the American School of Classical Studies at Athens. 75 (1): 33–81. doi:10.2972/hesp.75.1.33. ISSN 1553-5622. JSTOR 25067975. S2CID 162289053.
- Shepard, Jonathan (2010) [2009]. "General Introduction". In Shepard, Jonathan (ed.). The Cambridge History of the Byzantine Empire c.500–1492. Cambridge: Cambridge University Press. pp. 1–96. doi:10.1017/CHOL9780521832311. ISBN 978-1-139-05599-4.
- Smith, Lindsay (2020). "Fugitive Stones: The Temple of Athena Nike, Athens in Nineteenth-Century Photographs" (PDF). Nineteenth-Century Contexts. 42 (2): 137–158. doi:10.1080/08905495.2020.1733317. ISSN 1477-2663. S2CID 214102663. Archived from the original (PDF) on 29 June 2022.
- Sotiropoulos, Michalis (2022). Liberalism after the Revolution: The Intellectual Foundations of the Greek State, c.1830–1880. Cambridge: Cambridge University Press. ISBN 978-1-009-25465-6.
- St. Clair, William (1998) [1967]. Lord Elgin and the Marbles: The Controversial History of the Parthenon Sculptures. Oxford: Oxford University Press. ISBN 978-0-19-288053-6.
- St. Clair, William (2022). Who Saved the Parthenon? A New History of the Acropolis Before, During and After the Greek Revolution (PDF). Cambridge: Open Book Publishers. doi:10.11647/OBP.0136. ISBN 978-1-78374-461-9. S2CID 248842303. Archived from the original (PDF) on 27 May 2022.
- Tomlinson, Richard Allan (2021). "Archaeology". In Speake, Graham (ed.). Encyclopedia of Greece and the Hellenic Tradition. London: Routledge. pp. 119–122. ISBN 978-1-135-94206-9.
- Stefanidis, Ioannis D. (2021). "Diplomats and Diplomacy". In Kitromilides, Paschalis M.; Tsoukalas, Constantinos (eds.). The Greek Revolution: A Critical Dictionary. Cambridge, MA: Harvard University Press. pp. 364–384. ISBN 978-0-674-25932-4.
- Tomlinson, Richard Allan (1991). The Athens of Alma Tadema. Stroud: Alan Sutton Publishing. ISBN 978-0-86299-876-9.
- Travlos, John (1981). "Athens After the Liberation: Planning the New City and Exploring the Old". Hesperia. 50 (4): 391–407. JSTOR 147880.
- Tsiovas, Dimitris (2014). "Introduction: Decolonising Antiquity, Heritage Politics and Performing the Past". In Tziovas, Dimitris (ed.). Re-imagining the Past: Antiquity and Modern Greek Culture. Oxford: Oxford University Press. pp. 1–26. ISBN 978-0-19-967275-2.
- Tsouli, Chrysanthi (2020). "Kyriakos Pittakis: Sincere Patriot, Unwearied Guard and Vigilant Εphor of Αntiquities". In Lagogianni-Georgakarakos, Maria; Koutsogiannis, Thodoris (eds.). These Are What We Fought For: Antiquities and the Greek War of Independence. Athens: Archaeological Resources Fund. pp. 266–275. ISBN 978-960-386-441-7.
- Tsouli, Chrysanthi (2021). "Panorama of Personalities". National Archaeological Museum of Athens. Archived from the original on 21 December 2022.
- Tucker, Spencer C. (2009). A Global Chronology of Conflict. Santa Barbara: ABC-CLIO. ISBN 978-1-85109-672-5.
- Van Rookhuijzen, Janric (2021). "The Turkish Harem in the Karyatid Temple and Antagonistic Narratives on the Athenian Acropolis" (PDF). Opuscula. Annual of the Swedish Institutes at Athens and Rome. 14: 341–362. doi:10.30549/opathrom-14-16. ISSN 2000-0898. S2CID 239846299. Archived from the original (PDF) on 9 August 2022.
- Veloudis, Georgios (1970). "Jakob Philipp Fallmerayer und die Entstehung des neugriechischen Historismus" [Jakob Philipp Fallmerayer and the Emergence of Modern Greek Historicism]. Südost-Forschungen (in German). 29: 43–90. ISSN 2364-9321. Archived from the original on 23 April 2023.
- Voutsaki, Sofia (2003). "Archaeology and the Construction of the Past in Nineteenth-Century Greece". In Hokwerda, Hero (ed.). Constructions of the Greek Past: Identity and Historical Consciousness from Antiquity to the Present. Groningen: Egbert Forsten. pp. 231–255. ISBN 978-90-04-49546-3.

Preceded by Ludwig Ross	Ephor-General of Antiquities; 1843–1863	Succeeded by Panagiotis Efstratiadis
