= Louis-François-Sébastien Fauvel =

French diplomat, antiquarian and artist (1753-1838)

Louis-François-Sebastien Fauvel
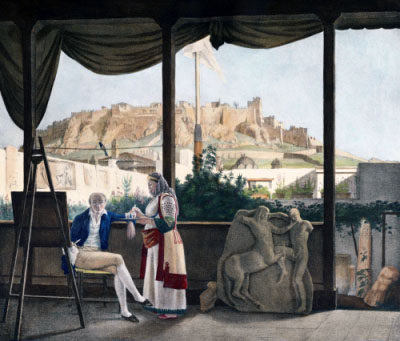
- Louis-François-Sébastien Fauvel before the Acropolis by Louis Dupré, 1819
- Born: 14 September 1753; Clermont-en-Beauvaisis, France
- Died: 12 March 1838 (aged 84); Smyrna, Ottoman Empire
- Occupations: Diplomat, antiquarian, artist.

Louis-François-Sebastien Fauvel (born 14 September 1753 in Clermont-en-Beauvaisis; died 12 March 1838 in Smyrna) was a French painter, diplomat and archaeologist who was long stationed in Athens. Fauvel has been called the "Father of Archaeology in Greece and, for his collection and exporting of Greek antiquities, its 'best-known systematic antiquities thief'.

== Biography ==
Louis-François-Sébastien Fauvel made his first stay in Greece from 1780 to 1782, in the service of the Comte de Choiseul-Gouffier. His archaeological work was meant to complete the Comte's Voyage pittoresque de la Grèce. When the Count was appointed the ambassador of France to the Sublime Porte in 1784, he again engaged Fauvel. The latter did not support the life of the embassy in the Ottoman capital and did many archaeological trips to collect the material for the future publications and the collection of antiques of his patron, through Greece or in the summer of 1789, Egypt. It was then that he expressed his tiredness of working for someone who did not recognize his qualities.

Fauvel settled permanently in Athens in the summer of 1793, after the emigration of Choiseul-Gouffier to Russia. In February 1796, he ended up being recognized for his archaeological work and named "non-resident partner" of the Institut de France. This assured him of funding for the pursuit of his research. He succeeded, for example, in sending to the Louvre a metope and a section of the Parthenon frieze.

The Egyptian campaign entailed his imprisonment and his expulsion from the Ottoman Empire. He arrived in complete destitution in Paris in December 1801, sixteen years after leaving France. He participated in the work of the Institute. Seeking to return to Greece, he obtained the post of Vice-Consul of France in Athens. He was back there in January 1803. There he competed with Lord Elgin's agents, including Giovanni Battista Lusieri, for the Parthenon marbles. Taking advantage of the reversal of the alliances, the French vice-consul managed to make the self-same agents search on his behalf. However, he could not carry out the archaeological work he was considering: he could not get away from Athens where his consular activities, however rare, held him back. Above all, he did not have the financial means to open large projects.

He then contented himself with limited research that he never published. In the same way, he sold the objects that he discovered, thus leaving the travellers who became the owners to publish their works on his discoveries. However, he played a key role in the development of archaeological knowledge of Athens and Attica by making the "cicerone" (guide) to the "tourists" who visited him. He was an early supporter and mentor of Kyriakos Pittakis, one of the first native Greek archaeologists and the future Ephor General of Antiquities.

During the Greek War of Independence, Fauvel attempted to save the surviving Turkish prisoners from the Siege of the Acropolis, several hundred of whom were massacred by irregular Greek forces in June 1822. (Note: The precise number of Turkish captives killed is unclear: estimates vary from 400 to around 600.) Along with the Austrian consul, Georg Christian Gropius, he sheltered some of the surviving prisoners in his house, which was attacked by around 2,000 Greek fighters, until the arrival of two French warships allowed their evacuation. His house, which housed his sizeable collection of antiquities, would later be destroyed in 1825. He fled the fighting to Smyrna, where he died in 1838.

== Bibliography ==
- Beresford, James (2016). "'Alchemy on the Acropolis: Turning ancient lead into restitutionist gold". The Historical Journal. 59 (3): 903–926. doi:10.1017/S0018246X15000242. S2CID 163841256.
- De Grummond, Nancy Thomson (2015-05-11). Encyclopedia of the History of Classical Archaeology. Routledge. ISBN 9781134268610.
- Hellman, Marie-Christine; Fraisse, Phillipe; Jacques, Annie (1982). Paris-Rome-Athens: Travels in Greece by French architects in the nineteenth and twentieth centuries [exhibition catalogue]. Houston: University of Texas Press. ISBN 9780890900321.
- Mallouchou-Toufano, Fani (2007). "The Vicissitudes of the Athenian Acropolis in the Nineteenth Century: From Castle to Monument". In Valavanis, Panos (ed.). Great Moments in Greek Archaeology. Athens: Kapon Press. pp. 36–57. ISBN 9780892369102.
- Pearce, Susan; Ormrod, Theresa (2017-06-16). Charles Robert Cockerell in the Mediterranean: Letters and Travels, 1810-1817. Boydell & Brewer. ISBN 9781783272068.
- Petrakos, Vasileios (2007). "The Stages of Greek Archaeology". In Valavanis, Panos (ed.). Great Moments in Greek Archaeology. Athens: Kapon Press. pp. 16–35. ISBN 9780892369102.
- Saunders, Nicholas J. (2007-07-30). Alexander's Tomb: The Two-Thousand Year Obsession to Find the Lost Conqueror. Basic Books. ISBN 9780465006212.
- Tregaskis, Hugh (1979). Beyond the Grand Tour: The Levant Lunatics. Ascent Books. ISBN 0-9064-0702-8.
- Wagner, Johann Martin; Schelling, F. W. J. (2017). Report on the Aeginetan Sculptures with Historical Supplements. State University of New York Press. ISBN 9781438464824.
