= Moncel =

Moncel may refer to:

== Communes in France ==
- Moncel-lès-Lunéville, Meurthe-et-Moselle department
- Moncel-sur-Seille, Meurthe-et-Moselle department
- Moncel-sur-Vair, Vosges department

== People ==
- Robert Giffard de Moncel (1587–1668), French-Canadian surgeon and apothecary
- Robert Moncel (1917–2007), Canadian Army officer
- Théodose du Moncel (1821–1884), French physicist
