= Meletis Vasileiou =

Greek revolutionary leader (died 1826)

Meletis Vasileiou (Greek: Μελέτης Βασιλείου; c. 1778–1826) from Chasia in Attica was a leader of the Greek War of Independence who contributed a lot to the organization of the revolutionary forces in Attica.

== Biography ==
An Arvanite, Vasileiou was born in about 1778 in Chasia and was a member of a poor family of farmers. As a man with a great influence, he managed to secure privileges for the area that suffered under Ottoman misrule. Furthermore, he was a member of the Filiki Eteria, a secret 19th-century organization whose purpose was to overthrow the Ottoman rule of Greece and establish an independent Greek state.

With the outbreak of the revolution, he managed to get permission to recruit men by tricking the Ottoman authorities pretending being loyal to them. On 18 April 1821 in Kalamos in Attica he fought the Ottoman troops coming from Euboea. A few days later he led the attack against Athens. More specifically, in the night between 25 and 26 April 600 gunmen attacked the walls from the side between Agioi Apostoloi and the Boubounistra Gate and quickly managed to capture the entire city except Acropolis. During the summer of the same year, a serious dispute broke out between Vasileiou and the elders of Athens concerning the military leadership of Attica, after the arbitrary assumption of leadership by him on 14 June. The next day, Vasileiou became the target of an assassination attempt while, probably in retaliation, rebels looted the house of an Athenian notable. The situation appeared to smooth temporarily after the intervention of Demetrios Ypsilantis and the dispatch of the Vasileiou and his men to Boeotia. However, later, he had a new conflict, this time with his compatriots, which according to one version, was triggered by the Athenian notables.

From 1822 until 1825 Vasileiou was gradually promoted to the grades of deputy chiliarch, chiliarch and eventually taxiarch. He took part in the battles of Schimatari, the Siege of the Acropolis and of Marathon, but also in the campaign of Odysseas Androutsos in eastern Central Greece. Later, Vasileiou was appointed by Yannis Gouras in charge of levying the tithe in Attica, thus rekindling local rivalries of previous years.

In May 1826 Meletis Vasileiou was murdered by his compatriots, who in the raid of Omer Pasha of Karystos in Attica rushed to declare their surrender to him, due to a disagreement with the commandant of the Acropolis, Yannis Gouras.
