= Théodose du Moncel =

French physicist, electricity advocate, and artist (1821–1884)

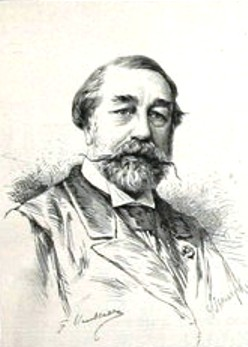
- Born: 6 March 1821; Paris
- Died: 16 February 1884 (aged 62); Paris
- Occupations: Physicist; Writer

Théodose Achille Louis Vicomte du Moncel or Théodore du Moncel (6 March 1821 – 16 February 1884) was a prominent French physicist and advocate of the use of electricity. He invented many electrical devices and wrote several books. He was also a proficient artist, making high-quality prints of scientific and cultural interest.

He also worked as a popularizer of knowledge on electricity.

In 1879, he founded the journal La lumière électrique.

He is one of the founders of the Société Nationale des Sciences Naturelles et Mathématiques of Cherbourg and was a member of the French Academy of Sciences.

He was conseiller général of the Manche département (1861–1870) (Canton of Cherbourg-Octeville-Sud-Ouest).

== Personal life ==
He married Camille Bachasson de Montalivet (1 September 1832–1887) on 28 November 1849. They had one daughter, Amélie du Moncel (1851–1909), who married Georges Dursus, comte de Courcy (born 1838), and they had two children:

- Yvan Dursus de Courcy (born 1873), who married Mathilde Buffenoir
  - Charles Dursus de Courcy
  - Camille Dursus de Courcy
  - Hervé Dursus de Courcy
- Hervé Dursus de Courcy (born 1876)

== Works ==
=== Books ===
- du Moncel, Théodore; Rühmkorff, Heinrich Daniel (1855). Notice sur l'appareil d'induction électrique de Ruhmkorff et les expériences que l'on peut faire avec cet instrument. Librairie de L. Hachette et ce.
- du Moncel, Théodore (1856). Exposé des applications de l'électricité: Notions technologiques. Vol. 1 (2nd ed.). Hachette.
- du Moncel, Théodore (1856). Exposé des applications de l'électricité: Notions technologiques. Vol. 2 (2nd ed.). Hachette.
- du Moncel, Théodore (1857). Notice historique et théorique sur le tonnerre et les éclairs. L. Hachette et Cie. Mallet-Bachelier.
- du Moncel, Théodore (1857). Exposé des applications de l'électricité. Vol. 3 (2nd ed.).
- du Moncel, Théodore (1858). Etude du magnétisme et de l'électro-magnétisme au point de vue de la construction des électro-aimants. L. Hachette et cie.
- du Moncel, Théodore (1859). Notice sur l'appareil d'induction électrique de Rhumkorff suivie d'un mémoire sur les courants induits. Lacroix & Baudry.
- du Moncel, Théodore (1859). Revue des applications de l'électricité en 1857 et 1858. Exposé des applications de l'électricité. Vol. 4 (2nd ed.). L. Hachette et cie ... ; Mallet-Bachelier.
- du Moncel, Théodore (1858). Étude des lois des courants electriques au point de vue des applications électriques. L. Hachette.
- du Moncel, Théodore (1862). Exposé des applications de l'électricité. Vol. 5 (2nd ed.). L. Hachette et ce.
- du Moncel, Théodore (1867). Notice sur l'appareil d'induction électrique de Ruhmkorff (5th ed.). Gauthier-Villars.
- du Moncel, Théodore (1869). Notice sur le cable transatlantique. Gauthier-Villars, imprimeur-libraire.
- du Moncel, Théodore (1878). Le téléphone, le microphone et le phonographe. Hachette.
- du Moncel, Théodore (1879). L'éclairage électrique. Hachette.
- du Moncel, Théodore (1882). Le microphone, le radiophone et le phonographe. Hachette.
- du Moncel, Théodore; Preece, William Henry; Siemens, Charles William; Howell, John White (1882). Incandescent Electric Lights: With Particular Reference to the Edison Lamps at the Paris Exposition. D. Van Nostrand.
- du Moncel, Théodore (1883). L'électricité comme force motrice. Hachette.

=== Articles ===
Many articles in La Lumière électrique, among them:

- du Moncel, Théodore (1880-06-15). "Transmission des images par l'électricité". La Lumière électrique. 1. 2 (12).
- du Moncel, Théodore (1880-07-01). "Le Téléphote et le Diaphote". La Lumière électrique. 1. 2 (13).
- du Moncel, Théodore (1880-10-01). "Reproduction des sons sous l'influence de la lumière. Photophone de M. Bell". La Lumière électrique. 1. 2 (19).
- du Moncel, Théodore (1880-10-01). "La télescopie électrique". La Lumière électrique. 1. 2 (19).
- du Moncel, Théodore (1880-11-01). "Quelques mots encore sur le photophone". La Lumière électrique. 1. 2 (21).
- du Moncel, Théodore (1881-03-19). "La téléphotographie". La Lumière électrique. 1. 3 (12).
- du Moncel, Théodore (1881-04-09). "Transmission électrique des images". La Lumière électrique. 1. 3 (15).

Academy of Science presentation:

- du Moncel, Théodore (1882-06-19). "en présentant son Ouvrage "Sur le microphone, le radiophone et le phonographe", s'exprime en ces termes". Comptes Rendus des Séances de l'Académie des Sciences. 94.

== Sources ==
- "Count Du Moncel (Obituary)". Nature. 29 (748): 412–413. 1884-02-01. Bibcode:1884Natur..29..412.. doi:10.1038/029412a0. ISSN 1476-4687.
- "Biographie T. Dumoncel". SocieteScienceScherbourg.org (in French).
- Bouvier, Yves (2008). "Les revues d'électricité et la construction d'une communauté internationale de pratique technologique à la fin du xixe siècle" [Electricity journals and the construction of an international community of technological practice in the late nineteenth century]. Le Temps des Médias (in French). 11 (2): 72. doi:10.3917/tdm.011.0072. ISSN 1764-2507.
- "La Lumière électrique (1879–1894, 1908–1916)". Conservatoire Numérique des Arts et Métiers.
