= Siege of the Acropolis (1821–1822) =

Battle of the Greek War of Independence

Coordinates: 38.0000°N 23.7167°E

First siege of the Acropolis
- Part of the Greek War of Independence
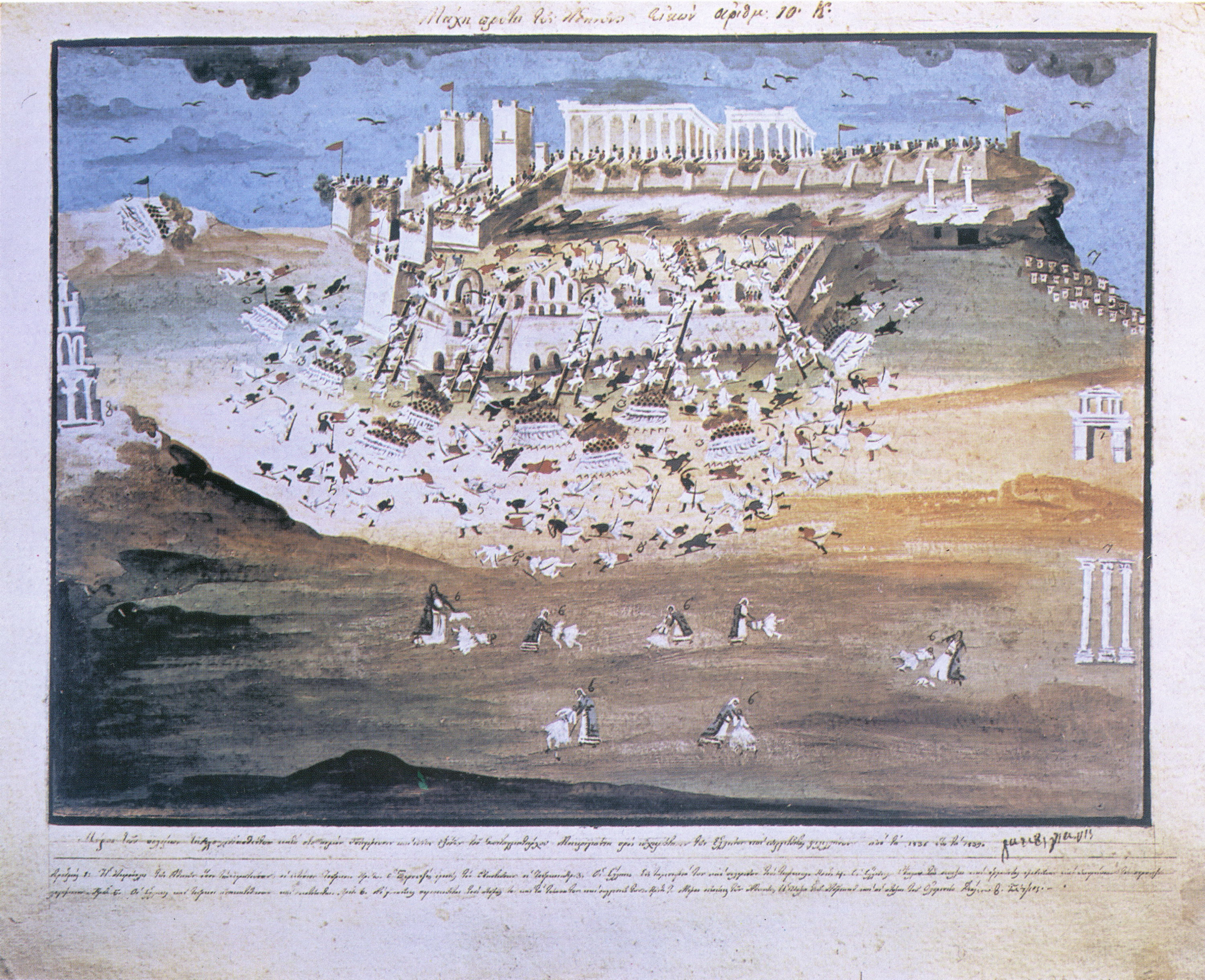
- "The first battle of Athens" by Panagiotis Zografos
Date	25 April 1821 – 9 June 1822 (O.S.) (1 year, 1 month, 2 weeks and 1 day)
Location	Athens, Sanjak of Eğriboz, Ottoman Empire (now Attica, Greece)
Result	Greek victory; Capture of the Acropolis

Belligerents
Greek revolutionaries (until 1 January 1822) (Greece) First Hellenic Republic (from 1 January 1822)	Ottoman Empire

Commanders and leaders
Meletios Vasileiou; Dimos Antoniou; Olivier Voutier	Omer Vrioni; Omar Bey of Karystos

Strength
600 (Initially); 3,000 (max)	Muslim inhabitants of Athens; Reinforced by Vrioni's army

Casualties and losses
Unknown	Unknown
- Unknown number of Greek, Turkish, and Albanian civilian deaths

The first siege of the Acropolis in 1821–1822 was the siege of the Acropolis of Athens by the Greek revolutionary forces, during the early stages of the Greek War of Independence.

Following the outbreak of the Greek uprising against the Ottoman Empire in March 1821, Athens fell into Greek hands on 28 April without a fight. Its garrison and Muslim inhabitants, along with the Greek population's leaders as hostages, retired to the Acropolis, which served as the garrison commander's residence. The initial Greek force, some 600 Athenians led by Meletios Vasileiou, was soon augmented by volunteers from Aegina, Hydra, Cephallonia and Kea to ca. 3,000, and maintained a loose siege of the fortified hill. A handful of Ottoman soldiers managed to break through the siege, and went to Karystos in Euboea to request the aid of the local governor, Omar Bey, and of the general Omer Vrioni. The two Ottoman leaders united their forces and descended on Attica. The Greek rebels scattered before them, and the Ottoman forces entered Athens on 20 July. Vrioni remained in Attica to pursue the Greek forces, while Omar of Karystos returned to his home province. After Vrioni's departure, however, the siege recommenced. In spring 1822, the Greek forces were reinforced with artillery commanded by French Philhellenes, under Olivier Voutier, who began a bombardment of the fortress. The Ottoman garrison surrendered on 9 June 1822 (O.S.).

== Aftermath ==
=== Terms of surrender ===
After nearly a year of being under siege, the Ottoman garrison at the Acropolis fortress surrendered on 9 June 1822. The terms of surrender were as follows:

- The Ottoman troops and civilians would be given free passage to Asia Minor on foreign ships not aligned with Greece
- Allow the Turks who wanted to stay in Athens to do so without significant trouble or harassment

=== Instances of violence ===
Greek irregulars stationed in Athens killed nearly half of the Ottomans who surrendered following the siege. Various other acts of violence occurred usually involving the killing of Albanian civilians.

== References and further reading ==
- David, Brewer (2011). The Greek War of Independence: The Struggle for Freedom and the Birth of Modern Greece, 1st Edition. New York, NY: The Overlook Press. ISBN 1590206916
