= Sanctuary of Asclepius, Epidaurus =

Coordinates: 37.5986°N 23.0744°E

UNESCO World Heritage Site
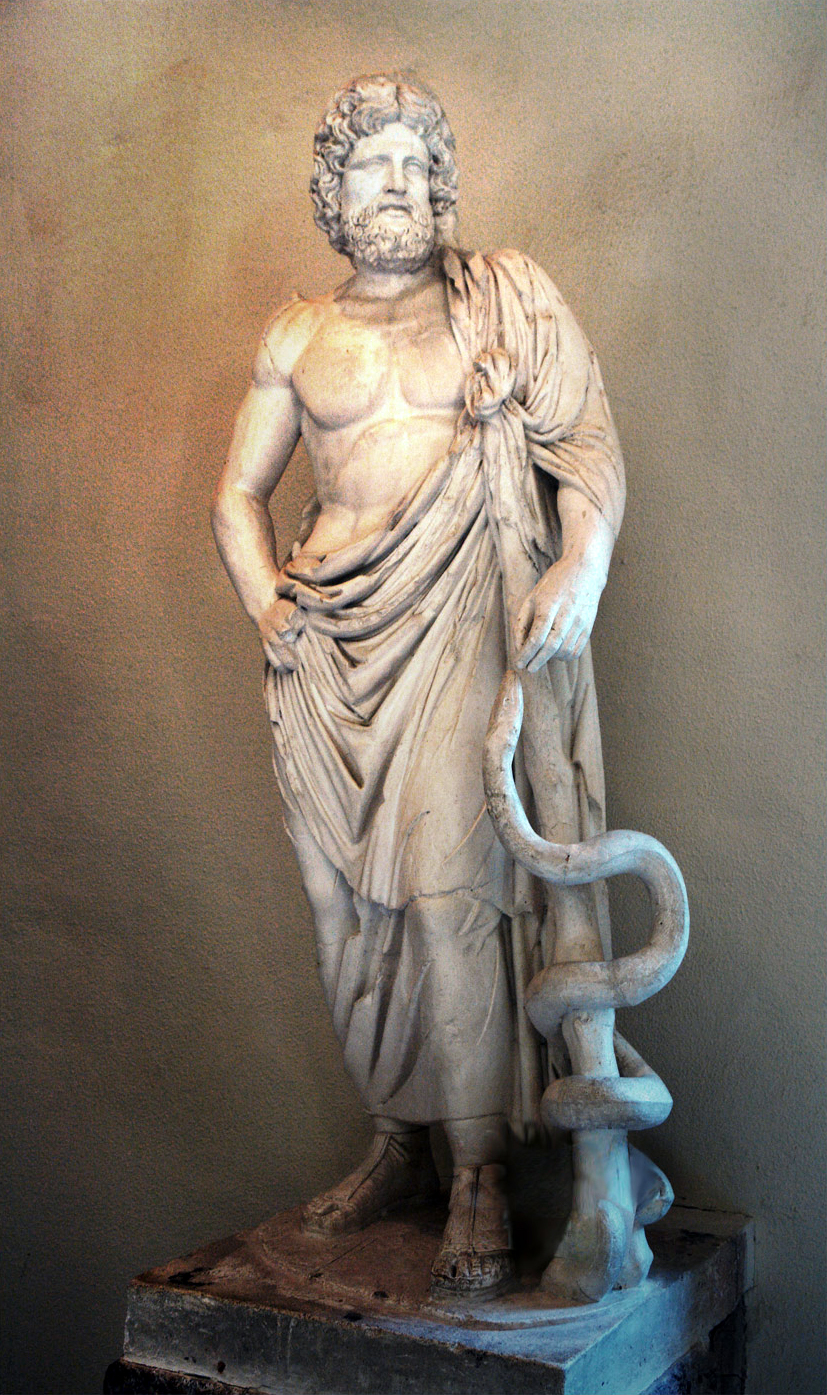
- Asclepius with his serpent-entwined staff, Archaeological Museum of Epidaurus
- Interactive map of Sanctuary of Asclepius, Epidaurus
- Official name: Sanctuary of Asklepios at Epidaurus
- Criteria: Cultural: i, ii, iii, iv, vi
- Reference: 491
- Inscription: 1988 (12th Session)
- Area: 1,393.8 ha (3,444 acres)
- Buffer zone: 3,386.4 ha (8,368 acres)

The Sanctuary of Asclepius was a sanctuary in Epidaurus dedicated to Asclepius. Especially in the Classical and Hellenistic periods, it was the main holy site of Asclepius. The sanctuary at Epidaurus was the rival of such major cult sites as the Sanctuary of Zeus at Olympia and Apollo at Delphi. The temple was built in the early 4th century BC. In 1988, the temple was inscribed on the UNESCO World Heritage List because of its exceptional architecture and its importance in the development and spread of healing sanctuaries (asclepeia) throughout classical antiquity. It was excavated between 1881 and 1928 by Panagiotis Kavvadias (and, from 1887, Valerios Stais), and between 1948 and 1951 by John Papadimitriou.

== Myth ==
The 2nd century AD geographer Pausanias described the myth around the foundation of the temple, as well as its religious significance to the worship of Asclepius (Description of Greece 2.26-28). According to him, Coronis, daughter of Phlegyas, had been impregnated by Apollo and gave birth to Asclepius at Epidaurus, exposing the newborn baby on Mount Myrtion, where he was nursed by a goat (usually identified with Kynortion hill to the west of the main sanctuary, where the sanctuary of Apollo Maleatas was located). The baby Asclepius is depicted with his goat on 2nd century AD Epidauran coinage.

== History ==
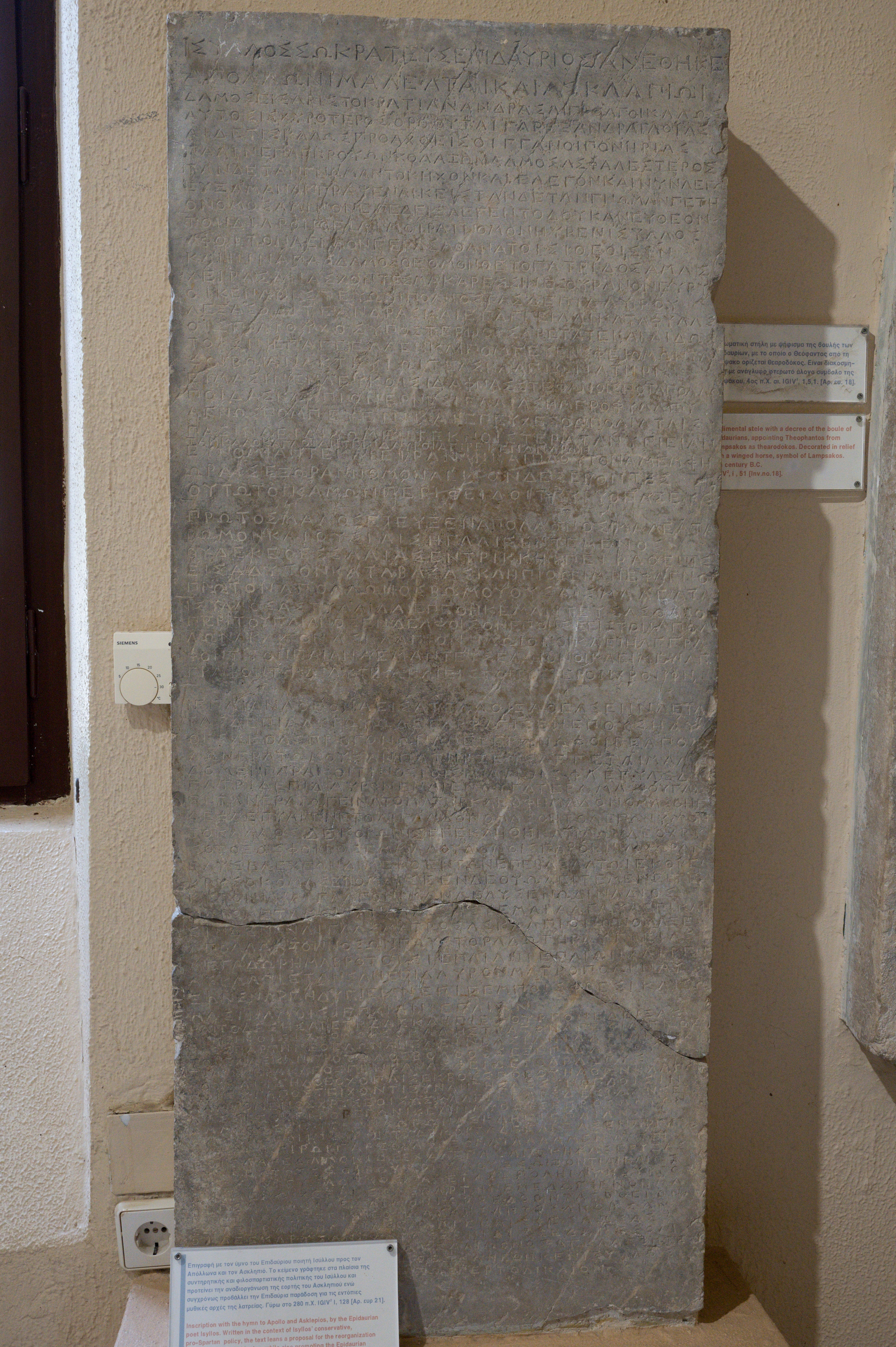
Inscription with Isyllus' sacred hymn

In the 4th and 3rd centuries BC, the Greeks embarked on an ambitious building program for enlarging and reconstructing monumental buildings. Fame and prosperity continued throughout the Hellenistic period. In the third century BC, the poet Isyllus established a new procession to celebrate the birthday of Asclepius, including a new sacred hymn, which he had inscribed in the Sanctuary of Apollo Maleatas on Kynortion hill, which was believed to be Asclepius' birthplace.

During the Achaean War in 146 BC, the Achaians converted the sanctuary into a stronghold. After Lucius Mummius defeated the Achaians and destroyed Corinth in 146 BC, he visited the sanctuary and left two dedications there.

In 87 BC, the sanctuary was looted by the Roman general Sulla. In 74 BC, Marcus Antonius Creticus installed a garrison in the city, causing a lack of grain. Sometime before 67 BC the sanctuary was plundered by pirates. Archaeological evidence reveals extensive damage in the first half of the first century BC. The guest house, gymnasium, and water supply system (required for most of the sanctuary's important rituals) were abandoned and the sanctuary of Apollo Maleatas was destroyed. Livy, in the early first century AD, speaks of how "Epidaurus ... was once rich with gifts for the god, which are now vestiges of wrecked dedications." Inscriptions claim that the town was rescued from total destruction by a series of gifts from a rich benefactor, Euanthes son of Eunomus, who was honoured with at least six monuments.

In the first century AD, the town was dominated by the wealthy Statilius and Claudius-Cornelius families, who dominated the main priestly offices, sponsored some construction work, and funded celebrations of the Apolloneia Asclapieia Caesarea Games.

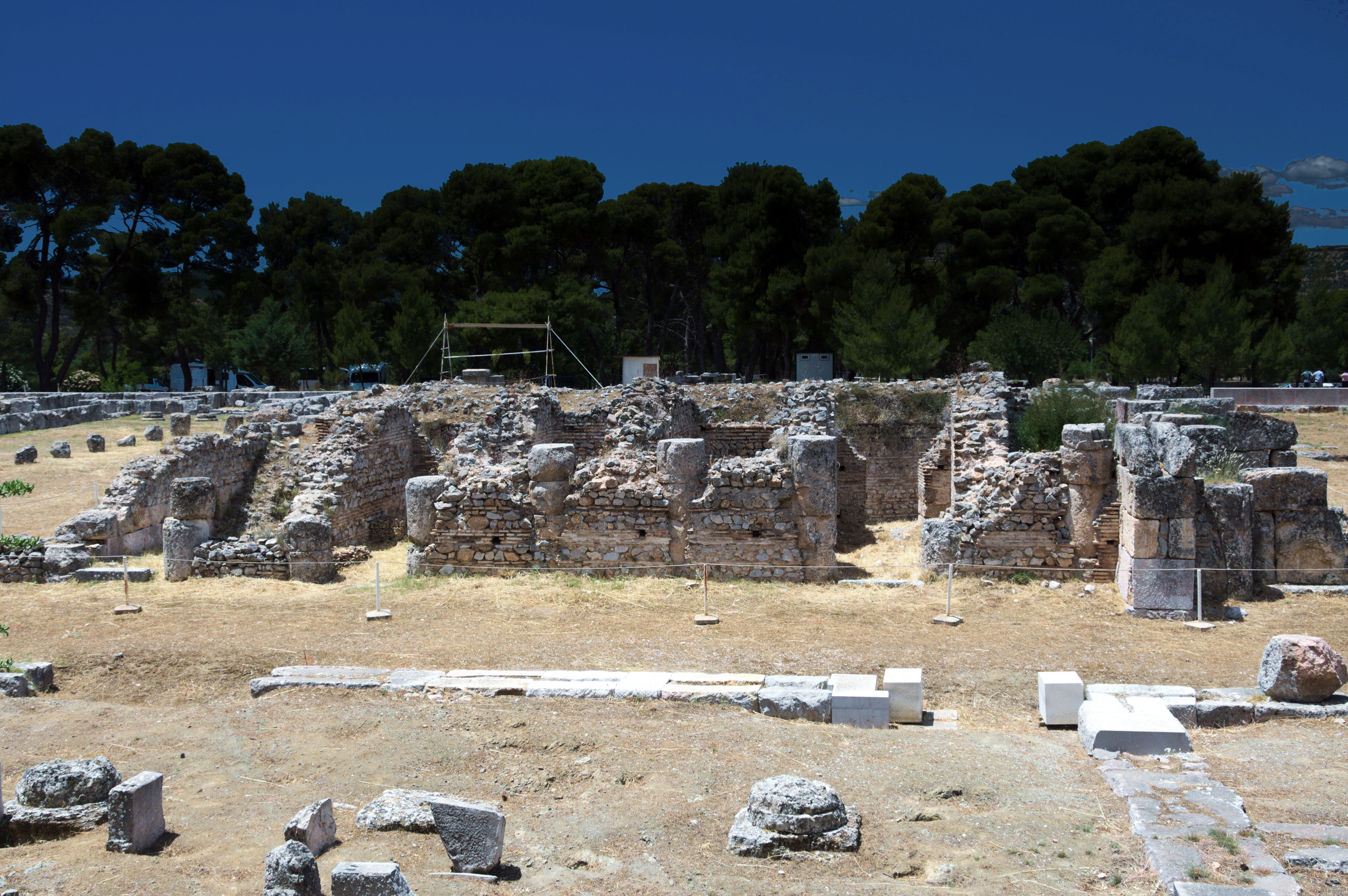
Odeon

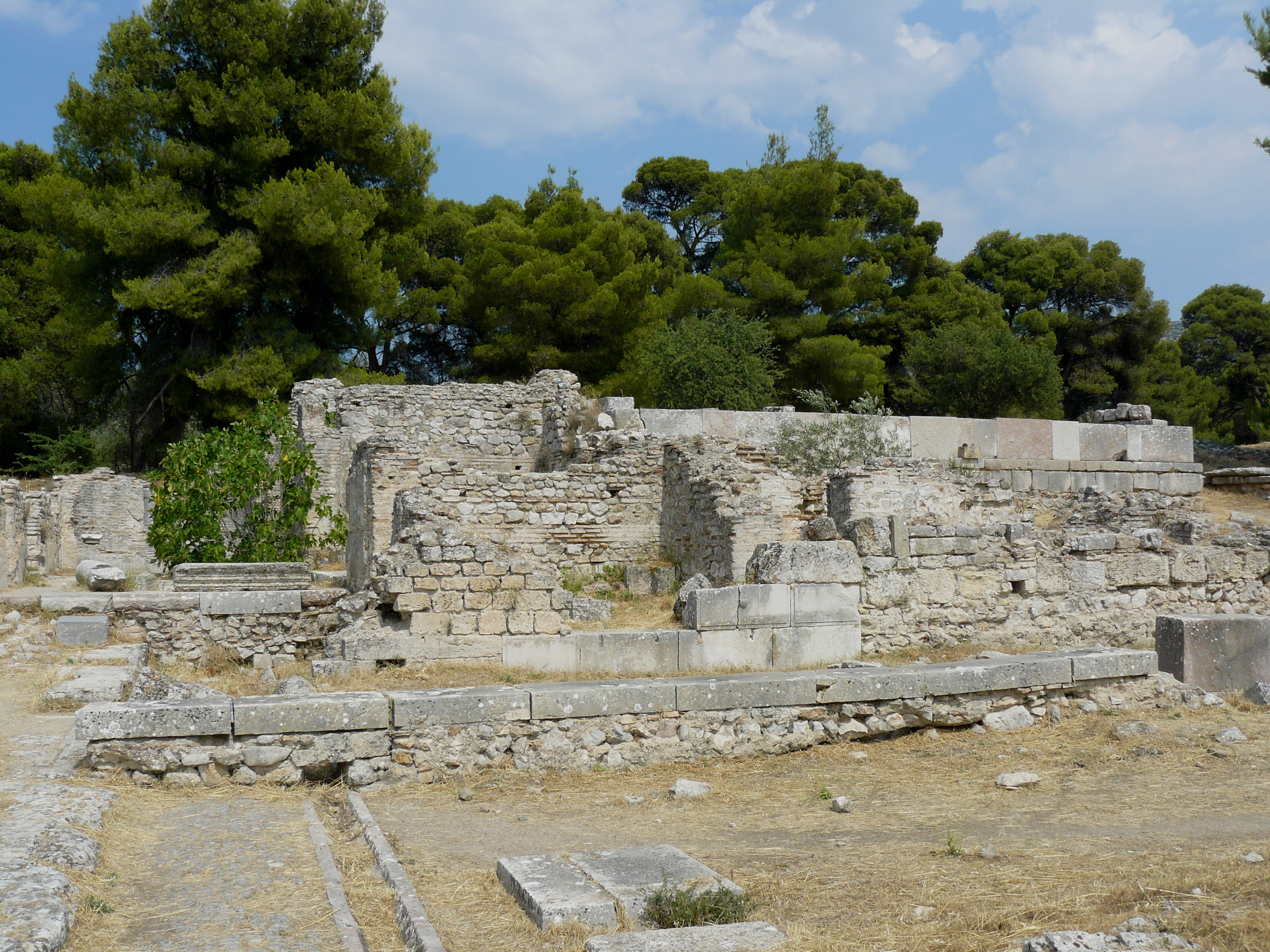
Roman baths

In the 2nd century AD the sanctuary enjoyed a new upsurge, prompted by the visit of Hadrian to the site in 124. Hadrian introduced a range of reforms, apparently influenced by the cult of Asclepius at Pergamum, which he was closely involved with. The priesthood of Asclepius was reformed, so that it became an annual office selected by allotment, rather than a lifetime office. The emperor reorganised the Asclepieia Games and moved their date so that they would not clash with other festival games in Greece. New cults were introduced, dedicated to "All the gods," Zeus Olympius, Zeus Panhellenius, Telesphorus (closely associated with the Pergamene Asclepieium). Asclepius was increasingly syncretised with Zeus and with Hadrian as Zeus Asclepius Soter ('Saviour'). Contemporary coinage seems to depict Hadrian and Asclepius as interchangeable. The Epidaurians honoured Hadrian with a new era, in which documents were dated by the number of years since Hadrian's visit.

In the 160s and 170s, a Roman senator from Nysa in Asia Minor, Sextus Julius Major Antoninus Pythodorus donated heavily to the sanctuary, which is recorded by Pausanias (2.27.6-7), honorific inscriptions and rooftiles stamped with his name found throughout the sanctuary. His donations included a bathhouse of Asclepius ("the north-east baths") and a temple to Hygieia, Egyptian Asclepius, and Egyptian Apollo. He also restored the Stoa of Cotys, the sanctuary of the Epidotae ("Helping gods" such as Machaon, Podalirius, the "hero doctor", Heracles, Tyche, Agathos Daimon, Nemesis, Artemis Enodia, Artemis Lysaea, Pan, Leto, Hypnos, and Oneiros), and the guest house. Other buildings of this period include the Library of Rufus and a small odeon in the gymnasium for "sacred theatre." As with the reforms under Hadrian, much of this work seems to have been inspired by the sanctuary at Pergamum. Other work focussed on reviving or restoring earlier Epidaurian cults and practices. Most notably, Pythodorus carried out extensive repairs to the Sanctuary of Apollo Maleatas, which had been abandoned since the early first century BC, adding a propylon, a nymphaeum, and a vast subterranean cistern ("the Skanà"). These repairs allowed the procession for Asclepius' birthday, instituted by Isyllus in the third century BC, to be revived.

In AD 395 the Goths raided the sanctuary. Even after the introduction of Christianity and the silencing of the oracles, the sanctuary at Epidaurus survived the persecution of pagans in the late Roman Empire, as it was still known as late as the mid 5th century as a Christian healing centre.

== Description ==
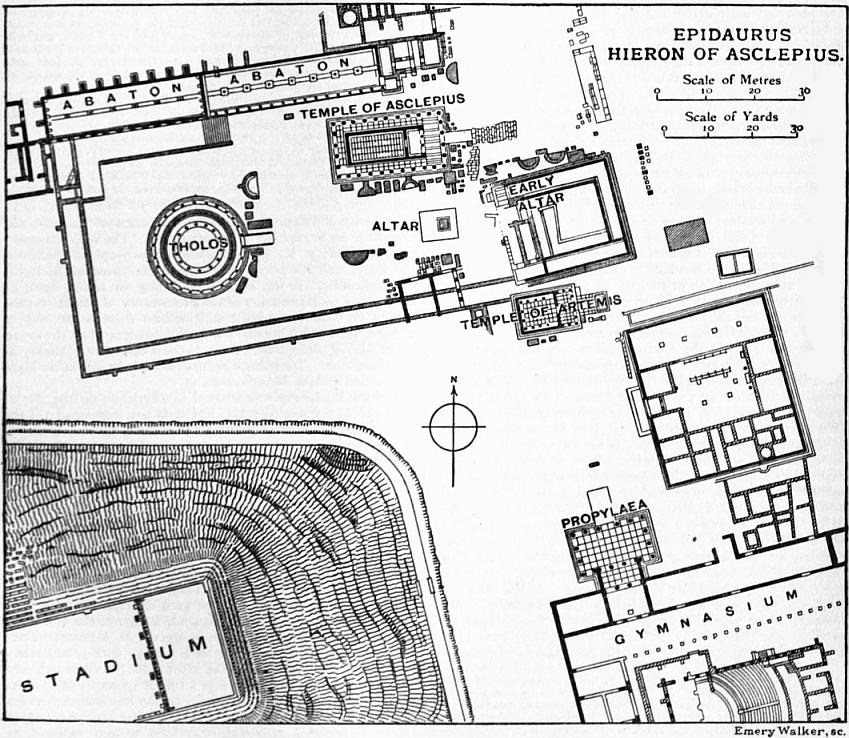
Plan of the main sanctuary

The main sanctuary consisted of the Temple and a number of structures clustered around it. The Theatre of Epidaurus is located on the hillside northwest of the sanctuary. To the west of the sanctuary was a sacred grove. Beyond the grove on Kynortion hill was the subsidiary sanctuary of Apollo Maleatas.

=== Temple ===
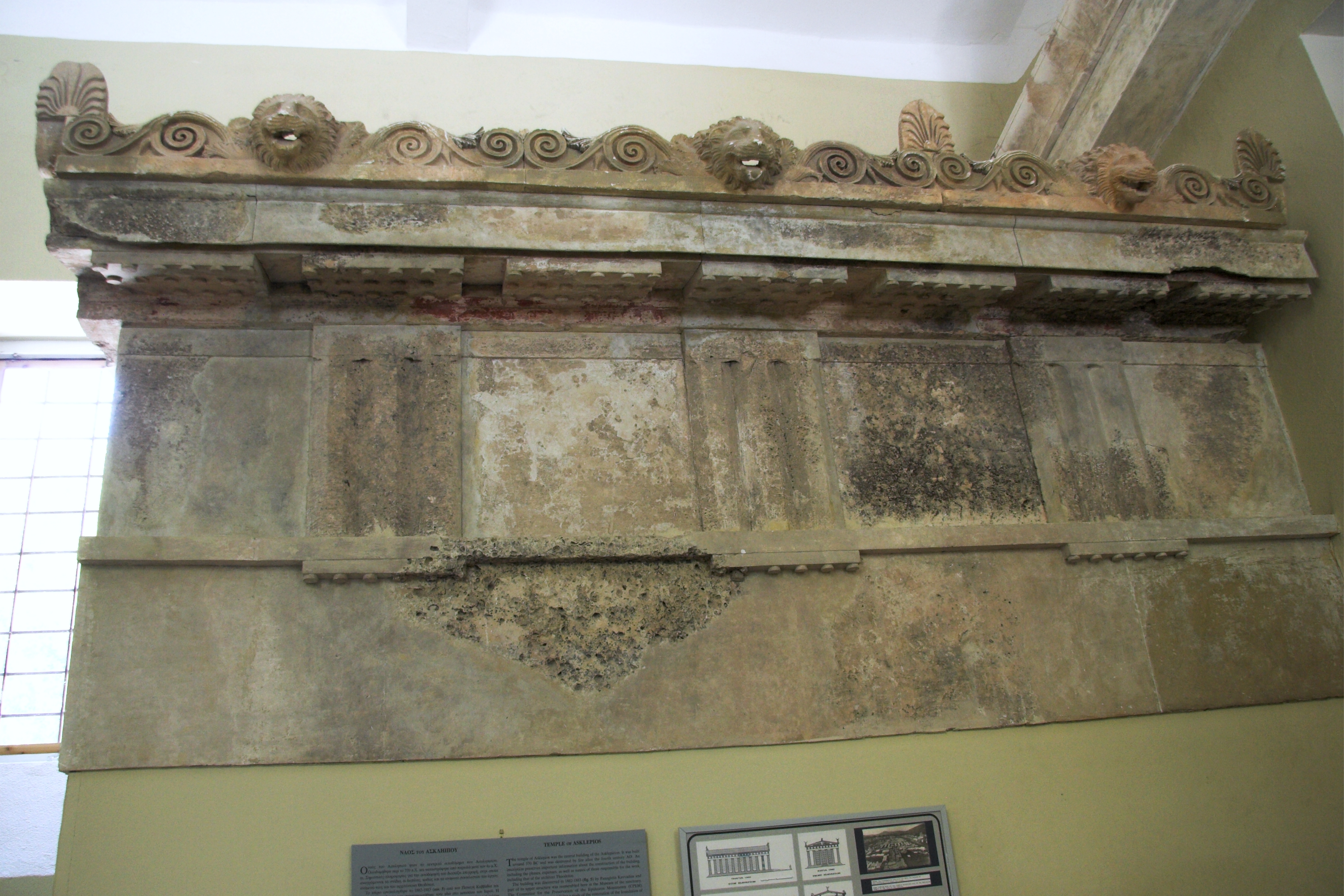
Portion of the Temple of Asclepius in the Epidaurus Archaeological Museum

The temple was Doric, six columns by eleven, measuring ca. 80 feet in length. An inscription excavated near the temple (Inscriptiones Graecae IV^{2} no. 102) gives a public record of the temple's construction. The inscription names Theodotus as architect. The project took nearly five years to complete. The temple had pedimental sculpture, front and back, and figural acroteria. These, the work of master sculptors of the period, occupy a prominent room in the National Archaeological Museum at Athens.

The gold and ivory cult statue of the god is described by Pausanias, who described the sanctuary in the 2nd century:

The sacred grove of Asklepios is surrounded on all sides by boundary marks. No death or birth takes place within the enclosure; the same custom prevails also in the island of Delos. All the offerings, whether the offerer be one of the Epidaurians themselves or a stranger, are entirely consumed within the bounds. At Titane too, I know, there is this same rule. The image of Asklepios is, in size, half as big as Zeus Olympios at Athens, and is made of ivory and gold. An inscription tells us that the artist was Thrasymedes, a Parian, son of Arignotos. The god is sitting on a seat grasping a staff; the other hand he is holding above the head of the serpent; there is also a figure of a dog lying by his side. On the seat are wrought in relief the exploits of Argive heroes..." [...] "When I asked at Epidauros why they pour neither water nor olive oil on the image of Asklepios [to keep the ivory in good condition], the attendants at the sanctuary informed me that both the image of the god and the throne were built over a cistern.

The temple is preserved in foundations only. Fragments of the upper structure, recovered in excavation, are in the archaeological museum at the site.

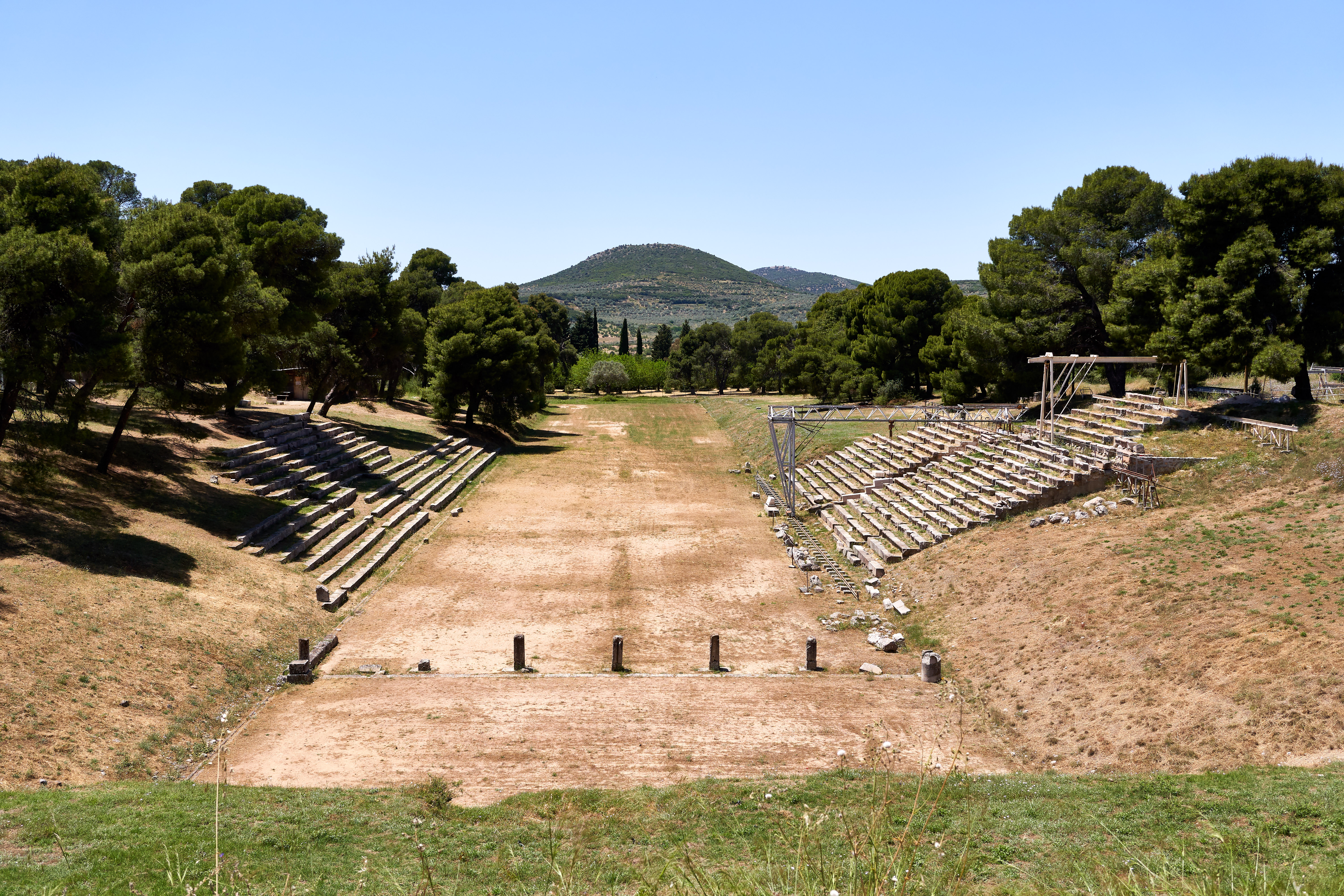
Stadion

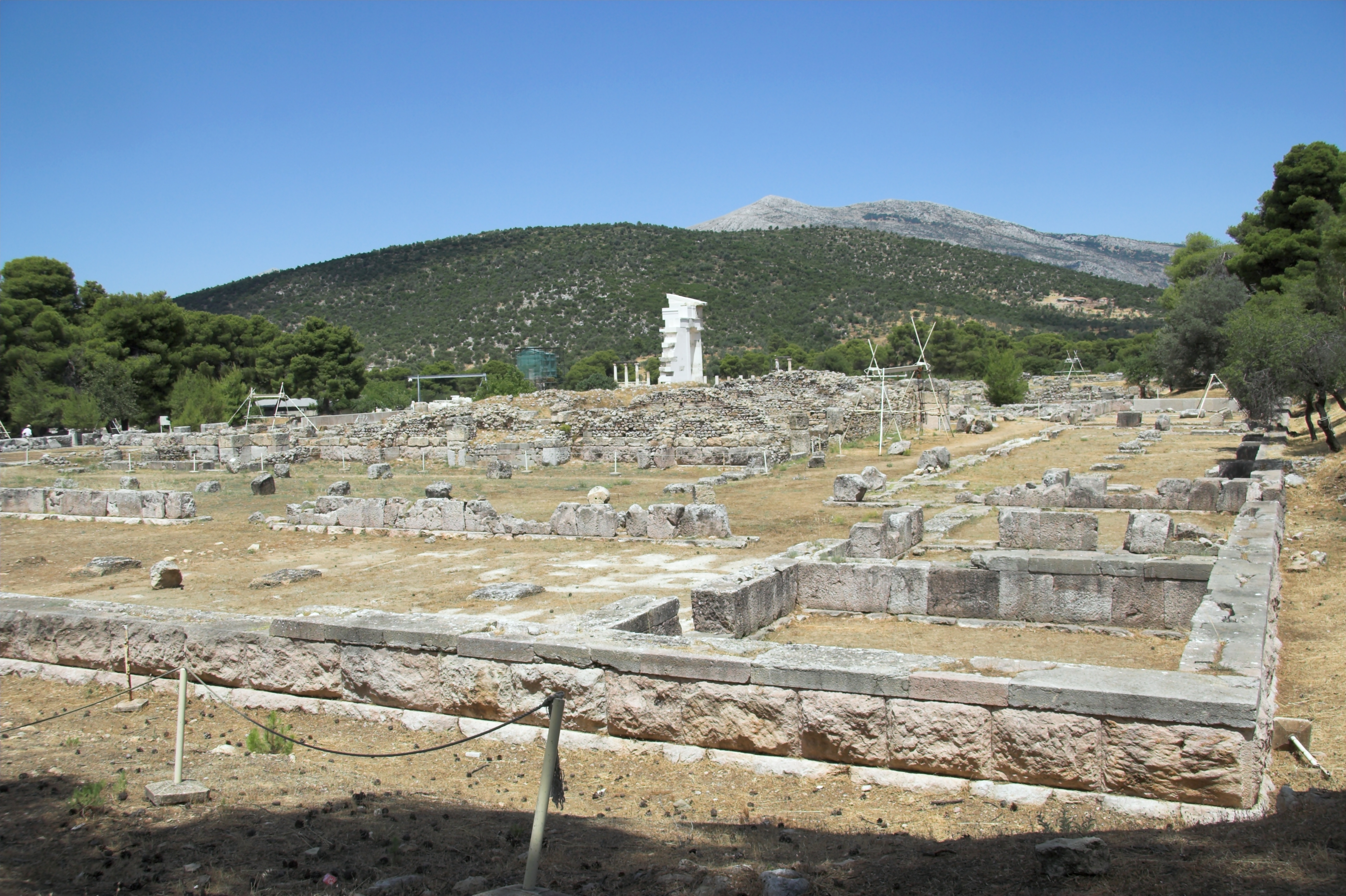
Hestiatorion ("Gymnasion")

The Temple of Asclepius itself was not alone on the site. Pausanias recorded several smaller buildings within the holy area and grove of the temple complex, such as a theatre, a temple of Artemis, an image of Epione, a sanctuary of Aphrodite and Themis, "a race-course... and a fountain worth seeing for its roof and general splendour."

== Worship ==
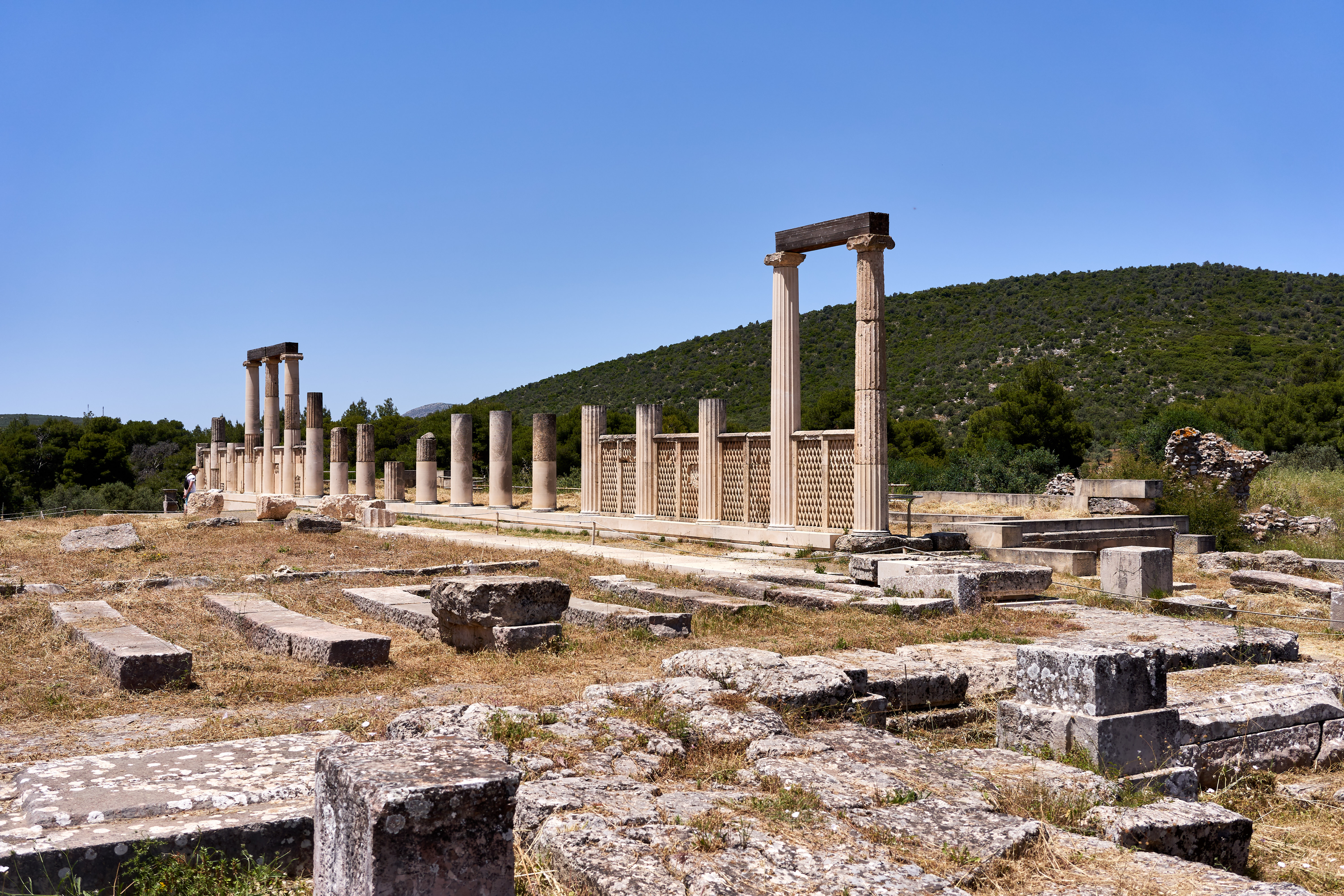
Abaton or Enkoimeterion

The temple had major religious importance in the cult of Asclepius. It was a site for holy pilgrimage from the entire ancient world, and influenced the worship of Asclepius in many other sanctuaries dedicated to him. Pausanias described how serpents were considered sacred to the god on the site: "The serpents, including a peculiar kind of a yellowish colour, are considered sacred to Asklepios, and are tame with men."

Pausanias described the worship and the site's importance as a pilgrimage in the 2nd century:

Over against the temple is the place where the suppliants of the god sleep. Near has been built a circular building of white marble, called Tholos (Round House) . . . Within the enclosure stood slabs; in my time six remained, but of old there were more. On them are inscribed the names of both the men and the women who have been healed by Asklepios, the disease also from which each suffered, and the means of cure. The dialect is Doric. Apart from the others is an old slab, which declares that Hippolytos dedicated twenty horses to the god. The Arikians tell a tale that agrees with the inscription on this slab, that when Hippolytos was killed, owing to the curses of Theseus, Asklepios raised him from the dead. On coming to life again he refused to forgive his father; rejecting his prayers, he went to the Arikians in Italy...

There were many legends, stories and miracles said to have taken place in the temple during the centuries of pilgrimage to it. Cicero alluded to the merciful nature of Asclepius when recounting how Dionysius I of Syracuse allegedly committed sacrilege at the sanctuary without divine punishment: "He gave orders for the removal of the golden beard of Aesculapius at Epidaurus, saying it was not fitting for the son to wear a beard when his father [Apollo] appeared in all his temples beardless... Nor did Aesculapius cause him to waste away and perish of some painful and lingering disease."

In the 3rd century, Aelian describes a legendary miracle taking place in the sanctuary:

A woman suffered from an intestinal worm, and the cleverest doctors despaired of curing her. Accordingly, she went to Epidauros and prayed to the god [Asklepios] that she might be rid of the complaint that was lodged in her. The god was not at hand. The attendants of the temple however made her lie down in the place where the god was in the habit of healing his petitioners. And the woman lay quiet as she was bid; and the ministers of the god addressed themselves to her cure: they severed her head from the neck, and one of them inserted his hand and drew out the worm, which was a monstrous creature. But to adjust the head and to restore it to its former setting, this they always failed to do. Well, the god arrived and was enraged with the ministers for undertaking a task beyond their skill, and himself with the irresistible power of a god restored the head to the body and raised the stranger up again. For my part, O King Asklepios, of all gods the kindliest to man, I do not set Wormwood [as a cure for intestinal worms] against your skill (heaven forbid I should be so insensate!), but in considering Wormwood I was reminded of your beneficent action and of your astounding powers of healing. And there is no need to doubt that this herb also is a gift from you.

== Excavations ==
On 28 March [O.S. 15 March] 1881, (Note: Greece adopted the Gregorian calendar in 1923; 28 February [O.S. 15 February] was followed by 1 March.) Panagiotis Kavvadias began excavations at Epidaurus on behalf of the Archaeological Society of Athens at Epidaurus, with the aim of uncovering the theatre described by Pausanias. These were the first excavations undertaken by the Society outside Athens, apart from minor and small-scale rescue excavations. In 1881, the excavations uncovered the theatre, as well as two stelae (inscribed stone slabs) in the Sanctuary of Asclepius. The stelae, dating to the late fourth or early third century BCE and sometimes called 'miracle inscriptions', recorded the names of at least twenty individuals and the means by which they were healed – usually miraculous dreams or visions. The excavation and publication of these stelae contributed significantly to Kavvadias's early archaeological reputation.

In 1882, Kavvadias uncovered the tholos (circular temple) and the Temple of Asclepius, followed by the abaton, (Note: The main part of the healing sanctuary, in which patients slept during the ritual of incubation.) in 1883. (Note: Glotz 1928, p. 270 (for the excavation and its date): for the identification of this structure as the abaton, see Dignas 2010, p. 168.) In 1884, he excavated the Temple of Artemis and the Great Propylaia, and reconstructed a row of columns in the western stoa of the abaton. The excavations continued until 1927: Valerios Stais joined them as a supervisor in early 1886, and became field director in 1887.

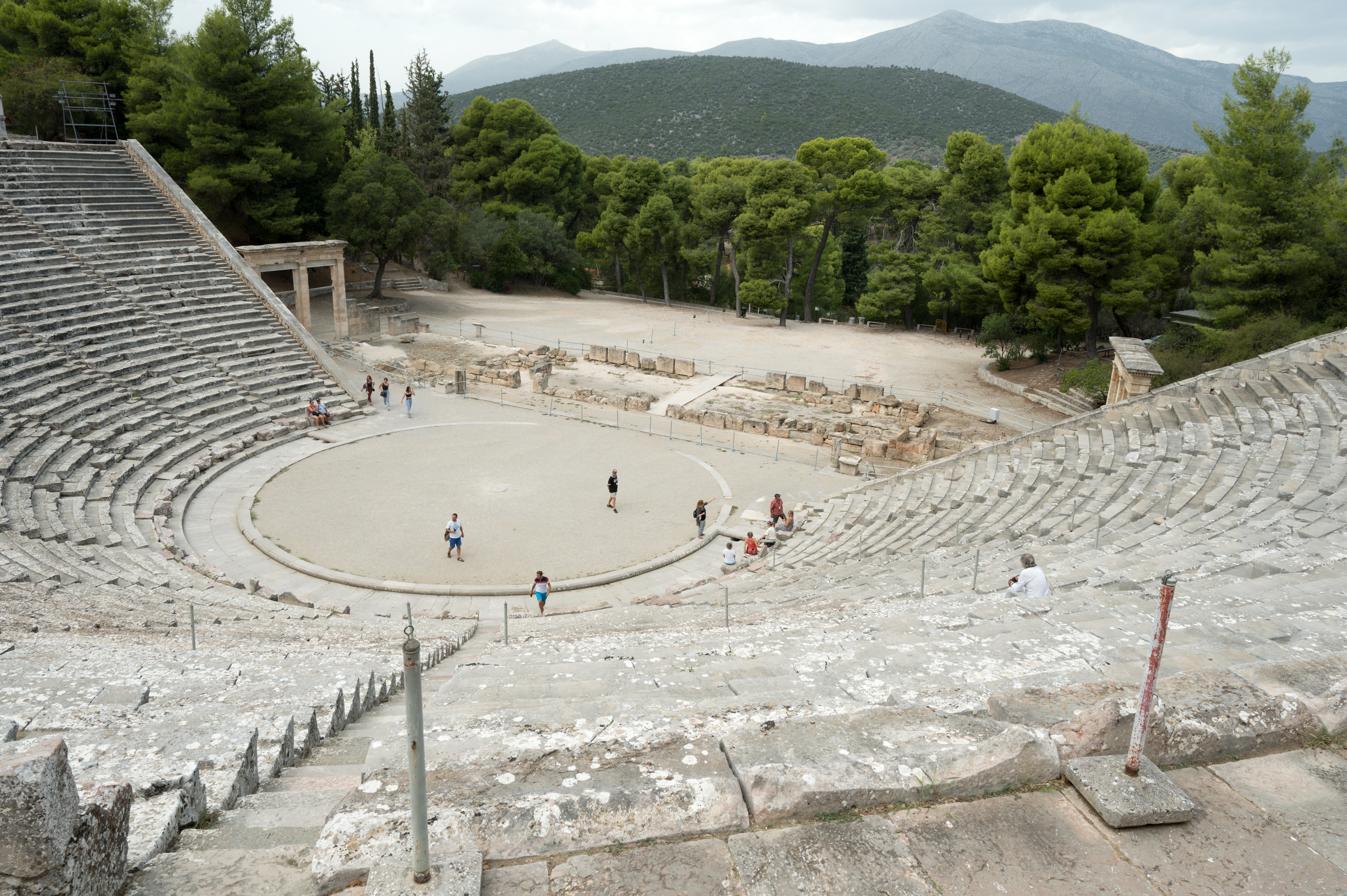
The Theatre of Epidaurus, excavated by Kavvadias in 1881

In 1896, Kavvadias excavated the first parts of the nearby Sanctuary of Apollo Maleatas on Mount Kynortion. That year, the French architectural historian Charles Chipiez described the excavation of Epidaurus as "of capital importance to the history of Greek architecture", though he criticised the restrained and limited reconstructions drawn up by the German Wilhelm Dörpfeld, who worked with Kavvadias and illustrated his publication of the excavations, in favour of the more lavish reconstructions created in 1895 by the French architect Alphonse Defrasse – reconstructions which, by the later 20th century, were considered largely erroneous. Kavvadias's report on his excavations of the Roman-period odeion at the site, which he published in 1900, has been described as "invaluable" for the amount of evidence it preserves, much of which has been lost through later deterioration in the building's condition.

Kavvadias returned to Epidaurus throughout his career. In 1902, he discovered the first parts of a building adjacent to the stadium (which had already been discovered by 1893), connected directly to it by means of an entrance tunnel. The findings from the building's excavation were never fully published; in 1992, the archaeologist Stephen G. Miller suggested that it may have been an apodyterion (changing room) for the athletes. In 1903, Kavvadias published part of the inscription upon a third stele, detailing further accounts of miraculous healings; he published the inscription in full in 1918. In his last excavation season at Epidaurus, which lasted from June 1928 until shortly before his death in July, he uncovered an elaborate building, possibly used by athletes preparing for competition, to the north of the stadium. John Papadimitriou excavated the site on behalf of the Archaeological Society between 1948 and 1951. Much of his work was simply clearing the site, though he made a systematic study of the Sanctuary of Apollo Maleatas. The excavation of Epidaurus has been described as a "landmark", both for its place in the institutional history of Greek archaeology and for the finds uncovered there.

== See also ==
- List of Ancient Greek temples

== Bibliography ==
- Aslanidis, Klimis (2015). "The Roman Odeion at Epidaurus". Journal of Roman Archaeology. 16: 300–311. doi:10.1017/S104775940001312X. S2CID 164670281.
- Bosanquet, Robert Carr (1929). "Obituary Notice: Dr. Panagiotes Kavvadias". The Antiquaries Journal. 9 (1): 46–47. doi:10.1017/S0003581500012786. S2CID 246043687.
- Chipiez, Charles (1896). "Les édifices d'Épidaure: remarques et observations critiques" [The Buildings of Epidauros: Critical Remarks and Observations]. Revue Archéologique (in French). 28: 38–59. JSTOR 41729622.
- de Grummond, Nancy Thomson (2015). Encyclopedia of the History of Classical Archaeology. Abingdon: Routledge. ISBN 978-1-134-26861-0.
- Dignas, Beate (2010). "A Day in the Life of a Greek Sanctuary". In Ogden, Daniel (ed.). A Companion to Greek Religion. Chichester: Wiley. pp. 163–177. ISBN 978-1-4443-3417-3.
- Glotz, Gustave (1928). "Éloge funèbre de M. Panagiotis Cavvadias, correspondant étranger de l'Académie" [Funerary Eulogy for Mr. Panagiotis Cavvadias, Overseas Correspondent of the Academy]. Comptes Rendus des Séances de l'Académie des Inscriptions et Belles-Lettres (in French). 72 (3): 269–273. Archived from the original (PDF) on 22 June 2022 – via Persée.
- Graf, Fritz (2015). "Healing". In Eidinow, Esther; Kindt, Julia (eds.). The Oxford Handbook of Ancient Greek Religion. Oxford University Press. pp. 505–520. ISBN 978-019-105-807-3.
- Hellner, Nils (2011). "Überlegungen zu achteckigen Stützen in der antiken Griechischen Architektur" [Thoughts on Octagonal Columns in Ancient Greek Architecture]. Revue Archéologique (in German). 52 (2): 227–262. doi:10.3917/arch.112.0227. JSTOR 41420259.
- Kavvadias, Panagiotis (1893). Fouilles d'Épidaure [Excavations of Epidaurus] (in French). Athens: S. C. Vlastos.
- Kiminas, Demetrius (2009). The Ecumenical Patriarchate. San Bernardino: The Borgo Press. ISBN 978-1-4344-5876-6.
- Mania, Ulrich (2018). "Gymnasial Buildings and Sanctuaries: A Contribution to the Formation of the Palaestra and an Interpretation of the So-Called 'Echo Stoa'". In Mania, Ulrich; Trümper, Monika (eds.). Development of Gymnasia and Graeco-Roman Cityscapes (PDF). Berlin: Pro Business Digital Printing. pp. 181–196. ISBN 978-3-9819685-0-7. Archived from the original (PDF) on 2 January 2023.
- Melfi, Milena (2007). I santuari di Asclepio in Grecia (in Italian). Roma: L'Erma di Bretschneider. pp. 17–209. ISBN 978-88-8265-347-7.
- Melfi, Milena (2010). "Rebuilding the Myth of Asklepios at the Sanctuary of Epidauros in the Roman Period". In Rizakēs, A. D.; Lepenioti, Cl. E. (eds.). Roman Peloponnese III: Society, Economy and Culture under the Roman Empire: Continuity and Innovation. Athēna: Kentron Hellēnikēs kai Rōmaikēs Archaiotētos. pp. 329–340. ISBN 9789607905543.
- Miller, Stephen G. (1992). Excavations at Nemea II: The Early Hellenistic Stadium. Berkeley: University of California Press. ISBN 978-0-52-021677-8.
- Papazarkadas, Nikolaos (2014). "Epigraphy in Early Modern Greece". Journal of the History of Collections. 26 (3): 399–412. doi:10.1093/jhc/fhu018.
- Petrakos, Vasileios (1987). H Εν Aθήναις Aρχαιολογική Eταιρεία: H ιστορία των 150 χρόνων της [The Archaeological Society of Athens: The History of Its 150 Years] (PDF). Library of the Archaeological Society of Athens (in Greek). Vol. 104. Athens: Archaeological Society of Athens. OL 47766951M.
- Petrakos, Vasileios (1997). Ιωάννης Κ. Παπαδημητρίου [John K. Papadimitriou]. Έπαινος Ιωάννου Κ. Παπαδημητρίου [Praise of John K. Papadimitriou] (PDF). Library of the Archaeological Society of Athens (in Greek). Vol. 168. Archaeological Society of Athens. pp. 9–51. ISBN 960-7036-70-0.
- Petrakos, Vasileios (2007). "The Stages of Greek Archaeology". In Valavanis, Panos (ed.). Great Moments in Greek Archaeology. Athens: Kapon Press. pp. 16–35. ISBN 978-0-89236-910-2.
- Reinach, Salomon (1928). "Panagiotis Kavvadias". Révue Archéologique. 5 (in French). 28: 128–130. JSTOR 23910488.
- Sineux, Pierre (2011). "La guérison dans les sanctuaires du monde Grec Antique: de Meibom aux Edelstein, remarques historiographiques" [Healing in the Sanctuaries of the Ancient Greek World: from Meibom to Edelstein, Historiographical Remarks]. Anabases (in French). 13 (13): 11–35. doi:10.4000/anabases.1713. Archived from the original on 19 February 2023.
- Tomlinson, Richard A. (1983). Epidauros. Austin: University of Texas Press. ISBN 0-292-72044-0.
- Trimmis, Konstantinos (2016). "The Forgotten Pioneer: Valerios Stais and his Research in Kythera, Antikythera and Thessaly". Bulletin of the History of Archaeology. 26 (1): 1–10. doi:10.5334/bha-558. hdl:1983/01500056-c564-4c31-b1b6-0d1f0bf037f5.
- Wroth, Warwick (1884). "The Miracles of Aesculapius". The Antiquary. 10: 259–263.
