= John Papadimitriou =

Greek archaeologist (1904–1963)

- Ιωάννης Κ. Παπαδημητρίου
- During the excavation of Grave Circle B at Mycenae, 1953
- Born: September 4 [O.S. August 22] 1904 (Note: Greece adopted the Gregorian calendar in 1923; February 28 [O.S. February 15] was followed by March 1. In this article, this date and all subsequent dates are given in the "New Style" Gregorian calendar, while dates before it are given in the "Old Style" Julian calendar.); Skyros
- Died: April 11, 1963 (aged 58); Athens
- Occupation: Archaeologist
- Awards: Gold Cross of the Order of George I

Academic background
- Education: University of Athens; Friedrich Wilhelm University of Berlin
- Thesis: Αι λευκαί λήκυθοι του ζωγράφου του Χάρωνος (The White-Ground Lekythoi of the Charon Painter) (1946)

Academic work
- Institutions: University of Athens; Greek Archaeological Service

John K. Papadimitriou (Greek: Ιωάννης Κ. Παπαδημητρίου, romanized: Ioannis K. Papadimitriou; September 4 [O.S. August 22] 1904 – April 11, 1963) was a Greek archaeologist. Along with George Mylonas, he excavated Grave Circle B, the oldest known monumentalized burials at the Bronze Age site of Mycenae.

The son of a schoolteacher, Papadimitriou studied archaeology and literature at the University of Athens. He served briefly in the Hellenic Navy and entered upon an academic career, before taking a post with the Greek Archaeological Service in 1929. Early in his career, he excavated on Corfu and at Nicopolis, and published two short studies on archaeological history. He also studied abroad at the Friedrich Wilhelm University of Berlin, which awarded him a doctorate in 1935.

During the Axis occupation of Greece, Papadimitriou joined the communist-led National Liberation Front; his left-wing views attracted suspicion and sometimes hostility from the Greek establishment in the years after the war, under Greece's strongly anti-communist regime. He excavated at the Sanctuary of Artemis at Brauron in Attica, and at the Sanctuary of Asclepius at Epidaurus, though both projects were largely sidelined by the discovery of Grave Circle B in 1951. Papadimitriou became co-director of the grave circle's excavation, which continued until 1954.

Following a year at the Institute for Advanced Study in Princeton, Papadimitriou returned to his excavations in Greece, where he unearthed the Temple of Artemis at Brauron, identified the Cave of Pan at Oenoe, and excavated bronze statues of Athena and Artemis in Piraeus. He was placed in charge of the Archaeological Service in 1958, and presided over a period of reform, expansion, and improvement. He was in post at the time of his death, from a heart attack, on April 11, 1963. Many of his reforms were undone by his long-time opponent, Spyridon Marinatos, who led the Archaeological Service under the Greek junta that came to power in 1967. After the fall of the junta in 1974, Papadimitriou's reputation was rehabilitated and the service was further reformed along the lines he had begun.

== Early life and career ==
John K. Papadimitriou was born on September 4 [O.S. August 22] 1904, on the Greek island of Skyros. His father, Konstantinos, was a schoolteacher from the island of Euboea. Papadimitriou received his school education on Skyros and in Chalcis on Euboea, before studying archaeology and literature at the University of Athens, graduating on January 29, 1926. In the same year, he joined the Hellenic Navy; (Note: Since 1914, Greek men have been required to undertake mandatory military service. In 1926, the required period of actual service was reduced from 18 months to 16.) the death of his father, also in 1926, meant that he was given reduced duties to support his mother.

Papadimitriou was appointed to a post as an assistant teacher of philology in Mouzaki, in northern Greece, but resigned it in 1927 to accept an offer of a job at the University of Athens, succeeding Ioannis Sykoutris, a lecturer in Greek literature. He joined the Archaeological Society of Athens, a learned society with a prominent role in archaeological research and excavation in Greece, on February 10, 1928. In the autumn of 1929, he left his university position, having passed the selection process to become an epimelitis (junior archaeological official) in the Greek Archaeological Service. His first post was at the Numismatic Museum of Athens, from November 1929, and he was granted a request for a transfer to Thebes the following July. He carried out excavations in the city with Antonios Keramopoulos, the ephor (archaeological superintendent) of the region. He published an article on the Frankish castles of Euboea in 1930.

In March 1931, Papadimitriou transferred, again at his own request, to the island of Corfu. He acted as an assistant to Ioannis Miliadis, the ephor of the island. In 1933, he published a short study of the Corfiot archaeologist Andreas Moustoxydis, the director of Greece's first national archaeological museum, based on a study of his surviving manuscripts. While on Corfu, he worked largely on Byzantine archaeology, publishing a study of the medieval Church of St Jason and St Sosipater.

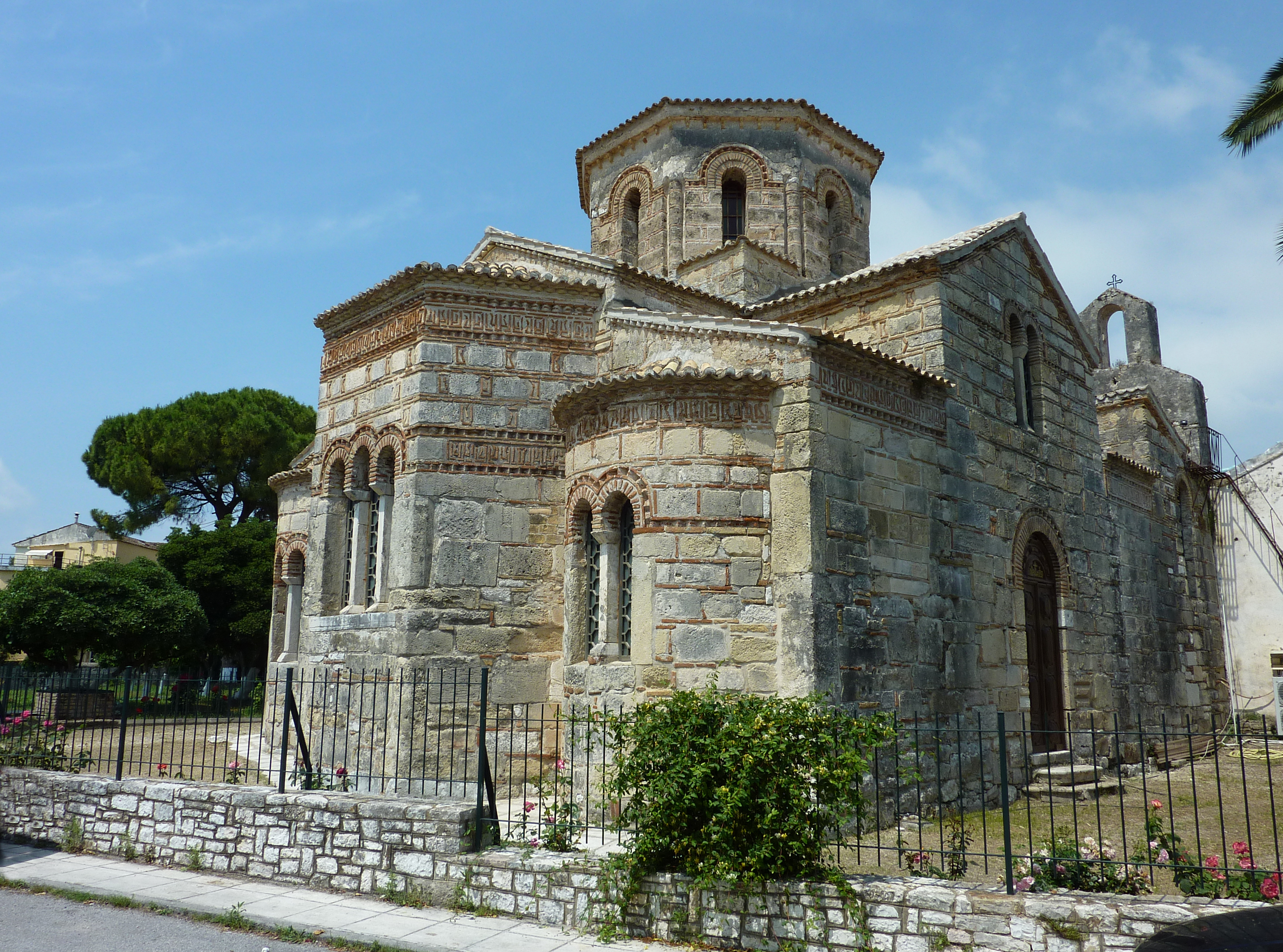
The Church of St Jason and St Sosipater, Corfu

Between November 1933 and February 1934, Papadimitriou spent a semester at the Friedrich Wilhelm University of Berlin, where he studied Roman art under Gerhart Rodenwaldt and attended courses by Robert Zahn, director of the Antikensammlung. He was promoted to the rank of ephor in 1934, and was awarded a doctorate by the Friedrich Wilhelms University in 1935. Also in 1935, he conducted a small excavation at Themi, a hill on Skyros, uncovering a Protogeometric grave. (Note: American Journal of Archaeology, April 1951, p. 149. Four further graves were excavated by Dimitrios Stavropoulos in 1938.) In 1936, he and Andreas Xyngopoulos investigated the basilica of Palaeopolis. Papadimitriou returned to Berlin for a two-year stint between 1936 and 1938, and again studied under Rodenwaldt while also taking courses from Antal Hekler. He may also have been taught by Ernst Buschor at the Ludwig-Maximilians-Universität München. During his time in Germany, in 1937, he published a brief study of the German classicist Friedrich Thiersch. In 1939, he excavated a fifth-century BCE temple in the village of Roda on Corfu. In 1940, he made a short excavation of the site of Nicopolis, the city founded by the Roman statesman Octavian in 29 BCE to commemorate his victory at the Battle of Actium.

=== Second World War ===
Greece entered the Second World War on October 28, 1940, when Italy invaded northwestern Greece. Papadimitriou was called up as a reservist in the Hellenic Army on November 13, but stood down on December 2. Still on Corfu, he was tasked with hiding the artefacts held in the island's museum, a task that was reported to be complete on March 21, 1941. On April 2, four days before the outbreak of war with Germany, he was again called up to the reserves, this time reporting to a command in Athens; he was demobilized on May 1, following the defeat of Greek forces and the German occupation of Athens. During the ensuing Axis occupation, Papadimitriou joined the National Liberation Front (EAM), the communist-led national resistance movement. He became a leading member of the EAM on Corfu. (Note: Katherine Biddle, who excavated with Papadimitriou at Mycenae in the 1950s, recalled seeing him order a group of German tourists to stop trespassing on the archaeological site, with "heated remarks about having had enough of Germans during the occupation".) In 1942, he carried out restoration work on the basilica of Palaeopolis, which had been damaged by bombing.

== Post-war archaeology ==
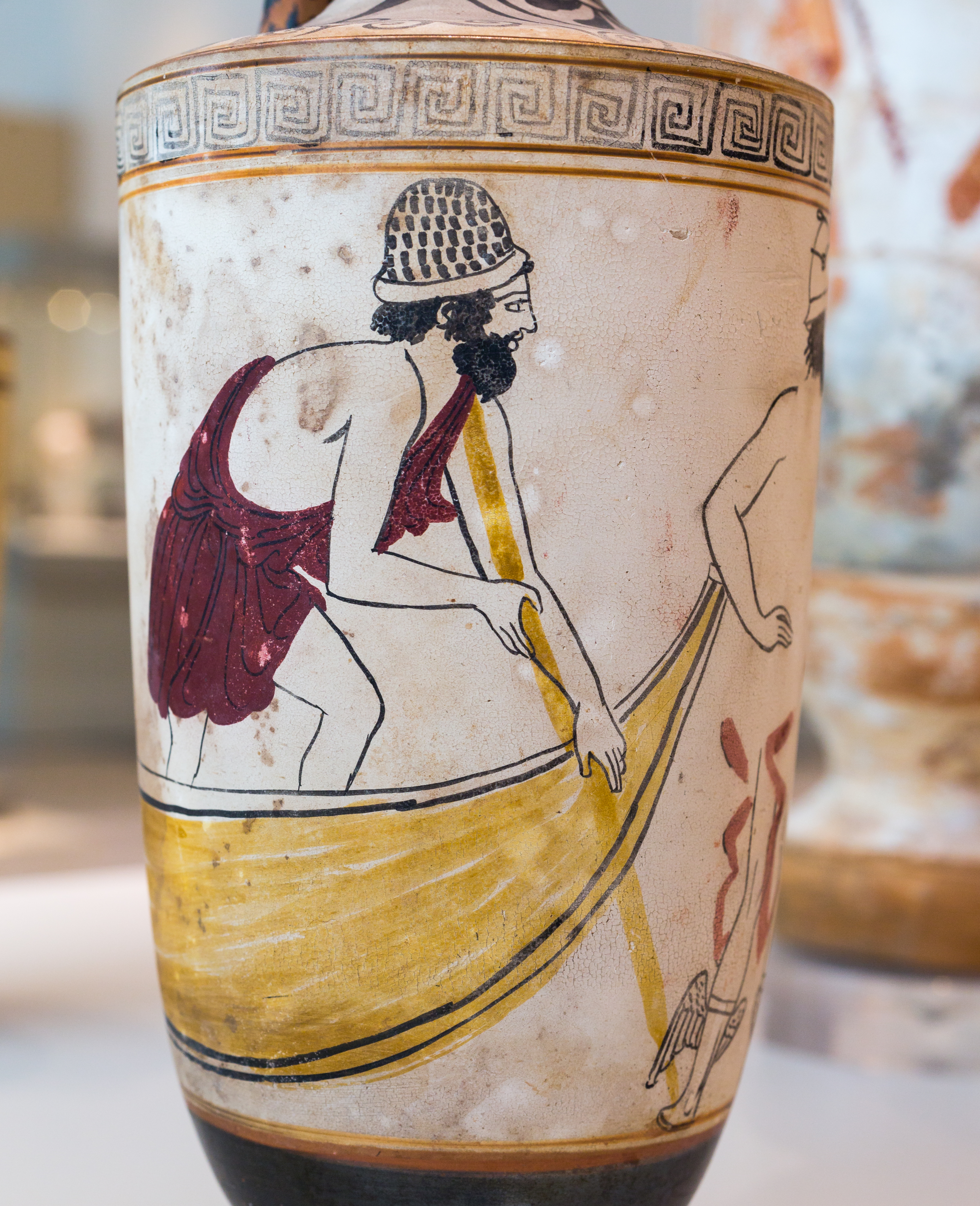
An Attic white-ground lekythos, c. 450 – c. 440 BCE, by the Charon Painter (also known as the Sabouroff Painter). The vase depicts Charon, the ferryman of the Underworld. (Note: "Terracotta lekythos (oil flask)". Metropolitan Museum of Art. On the identity of the Sabouroff Painter and the Charon Painter, see Vanderpool 1956, p. 459.)

After the war, Papadimitriou was considered politically suspect by the new anti-communist government, set up following the dismantling of the armed communist organizations in February 1945. (Note: Petrakos 1997b, p. 12. On the political developments, see Logotheti 2020, p. 338.) Angelos Tsoukalas, the governor-general of the Ionian Islands, wrote to the Ministry of Internal Affairs advising against removing Papadimitriou from Corfu, despite his role in spreading communist ideology there, on the grounds that it would create unrest among the rural population. On October 29, 1946, the prefect of Corfu wrote to the Minister of Education, who had ultimate oversight of the Archaeological Service, that Papadimitriou had "seduced most of the inhabitants of the island to communist ideology", and would have taken part in the Dekemvriana (the armed conflict between communist and royalist forces in December 1945) had he been able. No action was taken against Papadimitriou, and he was promoted to senior ephor in 1946. He received a doctorate from the University of Athens in the same year; he defended his dissertation, on white-ground lekythoi by the Charon Painter, on June 12.

In March 1947, Papadimitriou was moved to a supervisory position in Nafplio on the mainland, and shortly thereafter sent to the Greek embassy in Rome to assist with the repatriation of antiquities looted by Italian forces during the Axis occupation of Corfu. He applied unsuccessfully in November 1947 for the post of ephor of the Acropolis of Athens, which had been vacant since the resignation of Ioannis Miliadis in 1941. Instead, following a decision of June 25, 1948, he was transferred to a more prestigious post in Piraeus, the harbor of Athens, with responsibility as ephor for the region of Attica. His promotion was partly due to the support of Georgios Oikonomos, a professor at the University of Athens and former Minister for Education. The news was greeted with outrage by two of Corfu's newspapers, Eleftheria and Promachos, which both expressed disgust in August 1948 that "intellectuals [who] not only did not disavow the Dekemvriana ... but also reinforced the communist betrayal" were being promoted rather than fired. He retained responsibility for Nafplio, since there was no candidate to fill his post. (Note: Vasileios Petrakos calls 1948 "one of the most unfavorable post-war years in the history of the [Archaeological] Service".) Papadimitriou's office was in the National Archaeological Museum; he worked alone until 1950, when Dimitrios Theocharis was appointed as his assistant; Theocharis was succeeded by Euthemios Mastrokostas in July 1954.

Most archaeological excavation in Greece was suspended following the end of the Second World War in 1945; the ban was not fully lifted until 1952. (Note: The Greek Civil War lasted from 1944 until 1949; 1952 was the year that Greece adopted its post-war constitution.) In 1948, Papadimitriou began work on behalf of the Archaeological Society of Athens at the Sanctuary of Asclepius at Epidaurus in the Argolid, which had been excavated by Panagiotis Kavvadias until the latter's death in 1928. Much of Papadimitriou's work consisted of clearing the site, though he made a systematic study of the nearby Sanctuary of Apollo Maleatas, of which Kavvadias had made only precursory excavations. Papadimitriou began excavation of the Sanctuary of Artemis at Brauron, also under the auspices of the Archaeological Society of Athens, in eastern Attica later in 1948. Excavations there continued each year until the beginning of the 1950s, whereupon the project was halted until 1955. (Note: Kalliontzis 2020, p. 108. Kalliontzis states that the excavations stopped in 1950; Petrakos states that Papadimitriou excavated in 1949, 1950 and 1951.) and made a small excavation at the Argive Heraion in the summer of 1949. In 1950, he made his first excavation at the Bronze Age site of Mycenae, working in collaboration with Fotis Petsas on the excavation of some Mycenaean pottery warehouses.

On July 6, 1951, following the death of Oikonomos on June 21, Papadimitrou was elected to the council of the Archaeological Society. The same July, he was tasked with handing over the German Archaeological Institute at Athens (DAIA), surrendered by the Nazi occupying force to the Greek Ministry of Education in 1944, to Emil Kunze, representing the government of West Germany. Papadimitriou was brought in to replace Foivos Stavroupoulos, who had held responsibility for the DAIA since 1944, who was felt politically unsuitable for the task given his reactionary views and previous efforts to dismantle the bioethics and photographic archives of the DAIA. Papadimitriou took post on July 20 and handed over the institute to Kunze the following day.

== Grave Circle B ==
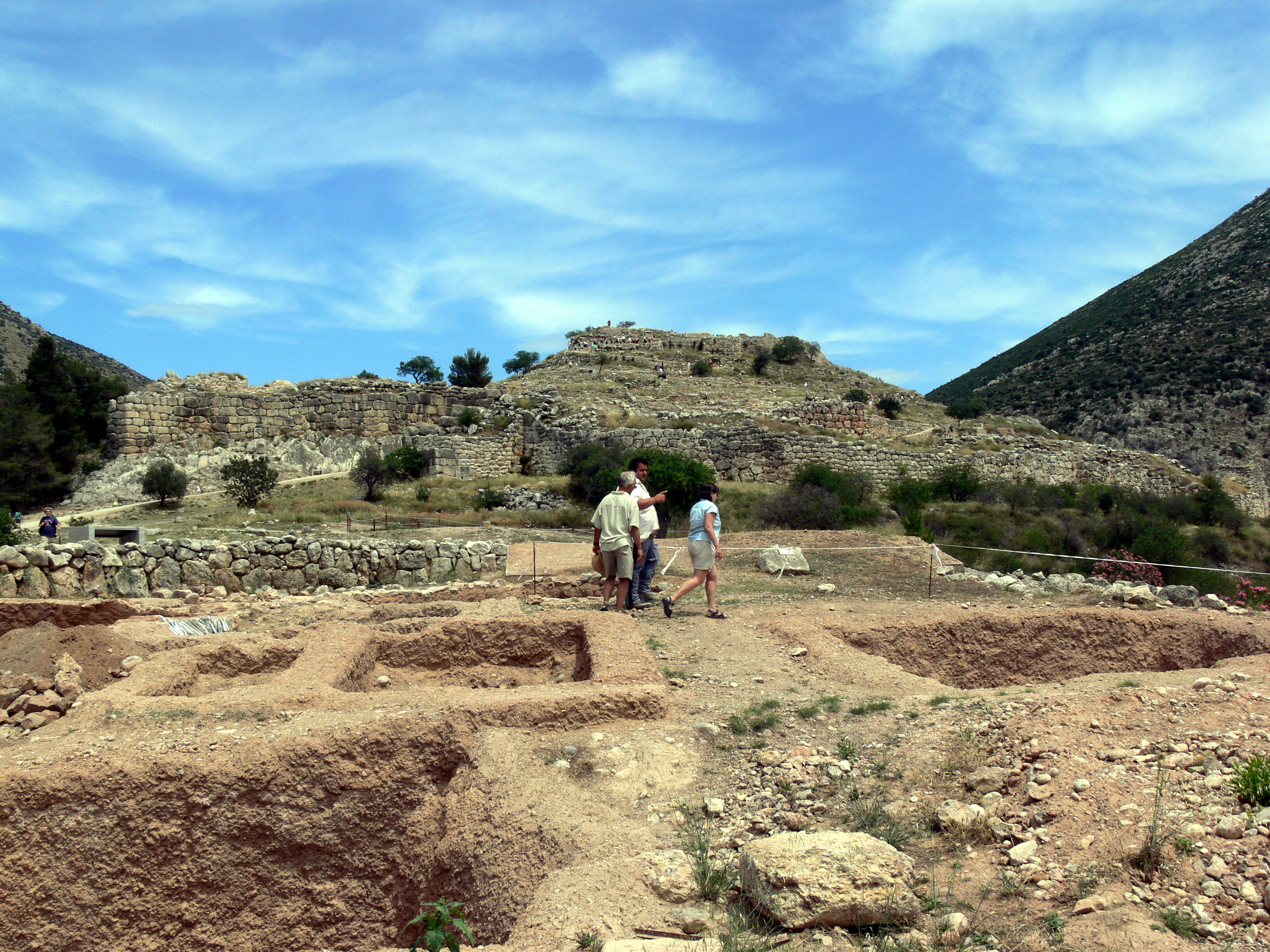
Grave Circle B at Mycenae, excavated by Papadimitriou and Mylonas in 1952–1953

On December 22, 1951, Papadimitriou visited, along with George Mylonas, what would become known as Grave Circle B at Mycenae. The grave circle had been discovered that November by the ephor Seraphim Charitonidis during restoration of the nearby Tomb of Clytemnestra. Mylonas and Papadimitriou cleared the area of the grave circle between January 5 and 11, 1952, funded by Washington University in St. Louis, where Mylonas was employed. Papadimitriou was appointed to lead the excavation, and organized a committee of archaeologists, consisting of Mylonas, Charitonidis, Antonios Keramopoulos and Spyridon Marinatos, to oversee the work.

The first season of excavation began on July 3, 1952, and continued until October 10, by which point seven tombs had been fully uncovered. The excavation was visited by King Paul of Greece and Queen Frederica, and Papadimitriou's work established his standing and reputation within the Archaeological Service: he was also awarded the Gold Cross of the Order of George I, Greece's second-highest order of merit. On October 18, 1952, he was interrogated by the Legality Council of the Archaeological Service concerning his involvement in EAM: he gave a declaration that he had been a member of EAM for six months, and had resigned in September 1944 on the grounds of a disagreement with the organization's position on Northern Epirus. (Note: Petrakos 1997b, p. 19. EAM's leadership had refused to endorse the Greek state's claim over Northern Epirus, a region of Albania in which many Greek nationals lived.) In the fall of 1952, he partially excavated the Cave of the Nymphs at Penteli in Attica, which had previously been discovered during quarrying work.

Papadimitriou co-directed the second season at Grave Circle B, which ran from July 31 to the first third of October 1953, with Mylonas; in this season, a further eleven tombs were excavated. The two returned to co-direct the third and final season of excavation, which Mylonas considered the most productive, between July 8 and September 6, 1954. This time, six more tombs were uncovered, leaving the central area of the grave circle fully excavated, and remains of Middle Helladic buildings in the eastern area of the site were investigated. During the excavation, Marinatos quarrelled with Papadimitriou, criticizing his leadership of the excavation and his methods, which he claimed were both too slow and insufficiently scientific. He made a complaint against Papadimitrou to the council of the Archaeological Society on June 15, 1953, and again by letter on June 28, but the council elected not to uphold either.

== Later career ==
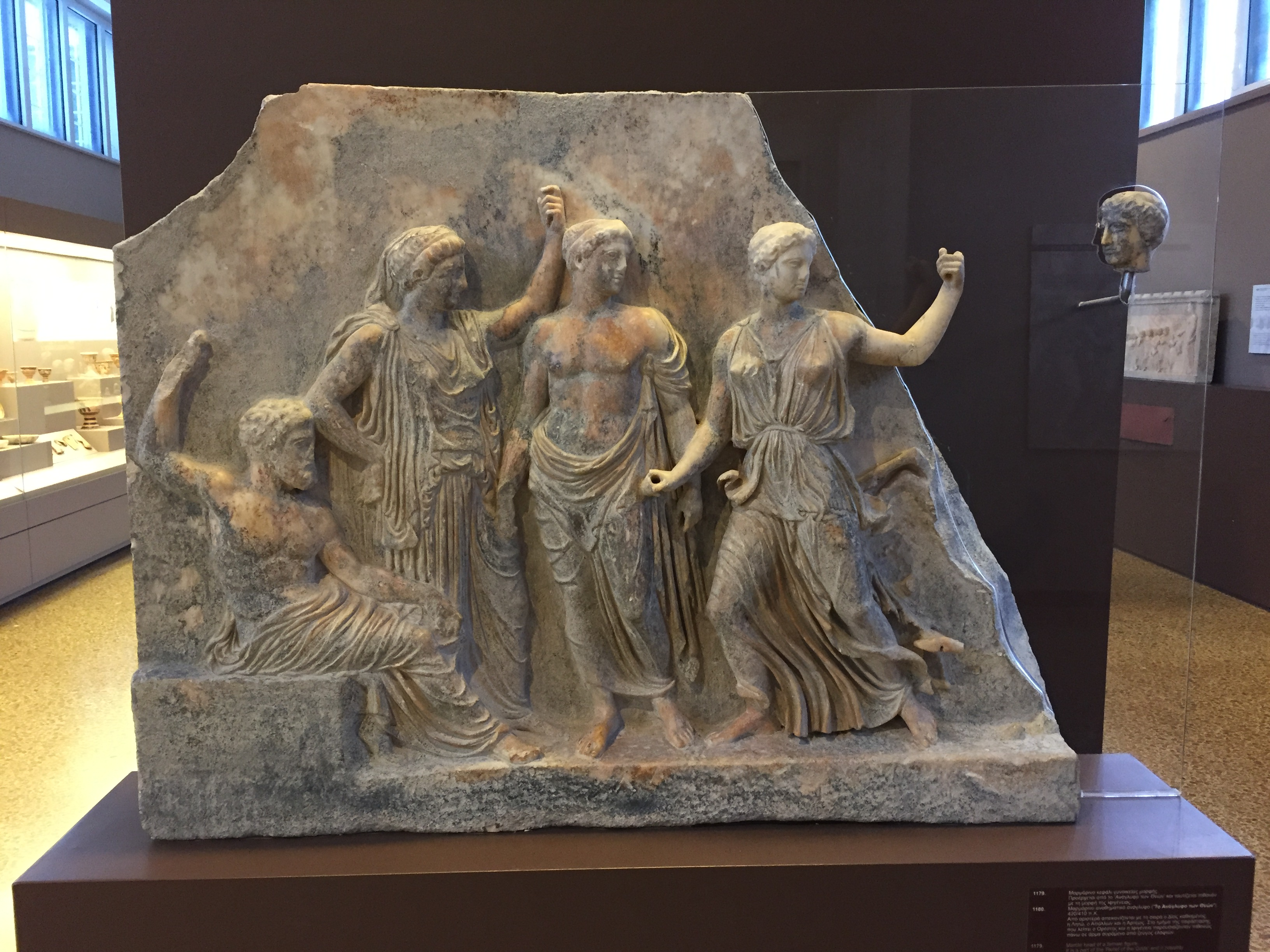
The "Relief of the Gods", uncovered by Papadimitriou at Brauron in 1961. The four figures are, from left to right, Zeus, Leto, Apollo and another female figure, perhaps Artemis or Iphigeneia.

In 1953, Papadimitriou excavated an archaic cemetery at Halae Aexonides near Voula in Attica, uncovering twelve tombs. He returned to excavate at Brauron in 1955 and 1956. He discovered the site's Temple of Artemis, using references in the works of the ancient Athenian playwright Euripides. In the 1955–1956 academic year, Papadimitriou was a fellow of the Institute for Advanced Study in Princeton, New Jersey. In 1957, he gained responsibility for the island of Euboea, as part of a deal by which the ephorate of Thebes transferred its oversight of the region to Papadimitrou's ephorate of Attica, in exchange for the site of Eleusis and those in Megaris.

In 1956 and 1957, he excavated the Temple of Artemis Tauropolos in Attica, which had previously been unearthed by Nikolaos Kyparissis. In February 1958, he identified a cave at Oinoe, near Marathon, as the Cave of Pan described by the second-century CE geographer Pausanias. Papadimitriou had been tasked by the Archaeological Society of Athens with locating the cave, and made a small-scale excavation there, uncovering parts of an inscribed stele showing that it had indeed been dedicated to the god Pan and to the Nymphs in the first century BCE. During the same year, he excavated a vaulted tomb at Vrana in Attica, discovered earlier by Georgios Sotiriadis. In July 1959, following the discovery of a bronze statue of Artemis and one of Apollo in Piraeus, he excavated a further Artemis statue and another of Athena, alongside two bronze shields. He also carried out excavations of a cemetery and a fifth-century-BCE house at Drafi in Attica, including the discovery of twenty tombs there in 1958.

Since the 1930s, the Greek Archaeological Service had gradually declined in prestige and independence. Following the dismissal in 1909 of its head, Panagiotis Kavvadias, as Ephor General of Antiquities, it had generally been led by university professors rather than archaeologists trained within its ranks. (Note: Kavvadias had also been a professor of the University of Athens, but was elected to his chair while already Ephor General.) Marinatos, who had been director of the Archaeological Service since 1955, was forced to resign in 1958 by the Prime Minister, Konstantinos Karamanlis. Anastasios Orlandos took on his responsibilities on a temporary basis, until Papadimitriou was appointed as his successor, following pressure from members of the Archaeological Service and with the support of King Paul. He took office in August 1958. The service's autonomy was also increased by moving it from the purview of the Ministry of Education to the Ministry of the Presidency, where it was supervised by the Prime Minister. This was also seen as a move to align the service's activity with the government's ambitions of increasing tourism, and three members of the Archaeological Council, including Marinatos and Nikolaos Kontoleon, resigned in protest. Papadimitrou resumed the publication of the Archaeological Bulletin, the service's journal, which had lapsed in 1938, and commenced works to improve the tourist infrastructure at Delphi, including the controversial construction of a new hotel at the site.

Papadimitriou secured additional funding for the Archaeological Service and expanded its staffing. In addition to the thirty-eight archaeologists employed in early 1959, he hired seventeen new epimelites (junior archaeologists) in two rounds, one in March 1959 and one that December. Of the first five hired, four were women, as were seven of the second batch of twelve: this reversed rules brought in by Marinatos in 1939, in line with the political programme of the dictator Ioannis Metaxas, that banned women from archaeological work. (Note: Petrakos 1995, p. 130. On the Marinatos-era ban, see Kokkinidou & Nikolaidou 2006, p. 168.) He was given the new title of Head of the Antiquities and Restoration Service of the Ministry of the Presidency in October 1960, and appointed to the revived position of Ephor General in September 1961. During the 1960–1961 season, he excavated the necropolis of Myrrhinus in Attica.

The newspaper Akropolis ran an article criticizing Papadimitriou's appointment on August 5, 1961, claiming that the transfer of the Archaeological Service to the Ministry of the Presidency would leave it open to a communist takeover, while the newspaper of the United Democratic Left political party expressed its hope that Papadimitriou would impress leftist ideals upon the future archaeologists of Greece. Papadimitriou died of a heart attack, during an excavation season he was conducting at Brauron, in Athens during the night of April 11, 1963. Only a small part of the site had been excavated by this time; the project did not resume until 1999, and most of the results of Papadimitriou's work remain unpublished as of 2009. At the time of his death, he was due to return to the Institute for Advanced Study in 1964.

== Personal life, assessment, and legacy ==
Papadimitriou was married to Katherine (née Laskaris), a native of Corfu who studied music in Rome. They had one son, Constantine, who also studied archaeology. The elder Papadimitriou was a member of the Rotary Club from 1926, and was profiled in its magazine in 1961.

The American archaeologist John Caskey credited Papadimitriou with successfully reorganizing and consolidating the Archaeological Service during his tenure, while Vasileios Petrakos, who worked as an epimelitis under Papadimitriou, attributed to him an improvement in the Archaeological Service's morale and relationship with the Greek government. In a 1963 obituary, Charles Picard reported Papadimitriou's reputation for good luck in his archaeological discoveries, and that more junior archaeologists would ask him to walk upon their chosen sites for good luck. Writing in 1995, Petrakos considered Papadimitriou the second most influential of the Archaeological Service's directors, behind Kavvadias, though to be more notable for his administrative than for his scholarly contributions. Picard called his death "a grave loss for the archaeology of Greece".

Papadimitriou was succeeded as head of the Archaeological Service by Ioannis Kontis, who continued Papadimitriou's reforms until his dismissal by the Greek junta which came to power in 1967. Much of Papadimitriou's work in reforming the Archaeological Service was undone by Marinatos, who was reappointed as its head upon the junta's accession and strongly opposed Papadimitriou's left-wing politics. After the fall of the junta in 1974, Papadimitriou's reputation was rehabilitated and many of his reforms reinstated, though Petrakos judges that a gap of "thirty lost years" occurred between Papadimitriou's death and the full recognition and restoration of his contributions to the Archaeological Service. A Festschrift in Papadimitriou's honor was published by the Archaeological Society of Athens in 1997. (Note: The Festschrift is Petrakos 1997a.)

== Published works ==
- Papadimitriou, John (1930). Φραγκικά κάστρα και οχυρώματα εν Εύβοια [Frankish Castles and Fortifications in Euboea]. Byzantinisch-neugriechische Jahrbücher (in Greek). 7: 412–464 – via Internet Archive.
- — (1931). Προϊστορικός συνοικισμός παρά τη λίμνην Λικέρι της Βοιωτίας [Prehistoric Settlement by Lake Likeri in Boeotia]. Πρακτικά της Ακαδημίας Αθηνών (in Greek). 6: 274–276.
- — (1949). Ανασκαφαί Ασκληπείου Επιδαύρου [Excavations of the Asclepeion at Epidaurus] (PDF). Πρακτικά της εν Αθήναις Αρχαιολογικής Εταιρείας (in Greek). 29: 91–99.
- — (1949). "Le sanctuaire d'Apollon Maléatas à Épidaure" [The Sanctuary of Apollo Maleatas at Epidarus]. Bulletin de Correspondance Hellénique (in French). 73: 361–383. doi:10.3406/bch.1949.2522.
- —; Petsas, Fotis (1951). Ανασκαφή εν Μυκήναις [Excavation at Mycenae] (PDF). Πρακτικά της εν Αθήναις Αρχαιολογικής Εταιρείας (in Greek). 106: 192–196.
- — (1951). Ανασκαφαί Επιδαύρου [Excavations of Epidaurus] (PDF). Πρακτικά της εν Αθήναις Αρχαιολογικής Εταιρείας (in Greek). 106: 204–212.
- — (1951). Ανασκαφή λακκοειδούς τάφου εν Μυκήναις [Excavation of a Cist Grave at Mycenae] (PDF). Πρακτικά της εν Αθήναις Αρχαιολογικής Εταιρείας (in Greek). 106: 197–203.
- — (1953). Οι Νύμφες της Πεντέλης [The Nymphs of Penteli]. Εκλογή (in Greek). Vol. 9.
- — (1957). Ανασκαφαί εν Βραυρώνι [Excavations in Brauron] (PDF). Πρακτικά της εν Αθήναις Αρχαιολογικής Εταιρείας (in Greek). 112: 42–47.
- — (June 1963). "The Sanctuary of Artemis at Brauron". Scientific American. 208 (6): 110–123. Bibcode:1963SciAm.208f.110P. doi:10.1038/scientificamerican0663-110. JSTOR 24936188.

== Works cited ==
- "Archaeological News". Archaeology. 3 (2): 120–124. 1950. JSTOR 41662377.
- Blau, George E. (1986) [1953]. The German Campaigns in the Balkans (Spring 1941). Washington, D.C.: United States Army Center of Military History. OCLC 16940402. CMH Pub 104-4. Archived from the original on June 19, 2009.
- Caskey, John L. (1963). "Necrology". American Journal of Archaeology. 67 (3): 301. doi:10.1086/AJS501381. JSTOR 501381.
- Christodoulou, Georgios (2009). Ο Ν. Γ. Πολίτης και η αρχαιολογία στο Πανεπιστήμιο Αθηνών [N. G. Polites and Archaeology at the University of Athens] (PDF). Mentor (in Greek). 93: 106–107. Archived from the original (PDF) on September 22, 2022.
- "Classification: Archaeology". The Rotarian. May 1961. pp. 26–30.
- Daux, Georges (1958). "Chronique des fouilles et découvertes archéologiques en Grèce en 1957" [Chronicle of Excavations and Archaeological Discoveries in Greece in 1957]. Bulletin de Correspondance Hellénique (in French). 82: 644–830. doi:10.3406/bch.1958.2361.
- de Grummond, Nancy Thomson (May 11, 2015). Encyclopedia of the History of Classical Archaeology. Abingdon: Routledge. ISBN 978-1-134-26861-0.
- "Dr. John Papadimitriou, 59, Dies; Led Greek Archeological Group; Uncovered 17th-Century B.C. Royal Cemetery in 1952 – Found Temple of Artemis". The New York Times. April 13, 1963. p. 16.
- Facorellis, Yorgos; Mari, Alexandra; Oberlin, Christine (2017). "The Cave of Pan, Marathon, Greece – AMS Dating of the Neolithic Phase and Calculation of the Regional Marine Reservoir Effect". Radiocarbon. 59 (5): 1475–1485. Bibcode:2017Radcb..59.1475F. doi:10.1017/RDC.2017.65.
- "Fifty-Second General Meeting of the Archaeological Institute of America (1950)". American Journal of Archaeology. 55 (2): 148–156. 1951. doi:10.2307/501281. JSTOR 501281.
- Gooch, John (2020). Mussolini's War: Fascist Italy from Triumph to Collapse, 1935–1943. London: Penguin. ISBN 978-0-241-18571-1.
- Hatzivassiliou, Evanthis (2022). "The Ghost of Trials Past: Transitional Justice in Greece, 1974–1975". Contemporary European History. 31 (2): 286–298. doi:10.1017/S096077732100014X. ISSN 0960-7773.
- Kahil, Lilly (1988). "Le sanctuaire de Brauron et la religion grecque" [The Sanctuary of Brauron and Greek Religion]. Comptes rendus des séances de l'Académie des Inscriptions et Belles-Lettres (in French). 132 (4): 799–813.
- Kalliontzis, Yannis (2020). "An Inventory List and a Votive Relief from the Sanctuary of Artemis Brauronia Found in Oropos". In Mackil, Emily; Papazarkadas, Nikolaos (eds.). Greek Epigraphy and Religion: Papers in Memory of Sara B. Aleshire from the Second North American Congress of Greek and Latin Epigraphy. Leiden: Brill. pp. 108–143. ISBN 978-90-04-44254-2.
- Kalogeropoulos, Konstantinos (2019). "Reflections on Pilgrimage at the Acropolis of Brauron". In Friese, Wiebke; Handberg, Søren; Kristensen, Troels Myrup (eds.). Ascending and Descending the Acropolis: Movement in Athenian Religion. Aarhus University Press. pp. 221–254. ISBN 978-87-7184-862-5.
- Kiminas, Demetrius (2009). The Ecumenical Patriarchate. San Bernardino: The Borgo Press. ISBN 978-1-4344-5876-6.
- Kokkinidou, Dimitra; Nikolaidou, Marianna (2006) [2004]. "On the Stage and Behind the Scenes: Greek Archaeology in Times of Dictatorship". In Galaty, Michael L.; Watkinson, Charles (eds.). Archaeology Under Dictatorship. New York: Springer. pp. 155–190. ISBN 0306485095.
- Kyrikakis, Michael (2016). Η υποχρέωση στράτευσης κατά το ελληνικό και κυπριακό δίκαιο – συγκριτική μελέτη [The Obligation of Military Service under Greek and Cypriot Law – A Comparative Study] (PDF) (PhD thesis) (in Greek). National and Kapodistrian University of Athens.
- Logotheti, Amaryllis (2020). "The Religious Justification of Anti-Communist Persecution in Greece (1920–1949)". In Gerlach, Christian; Six, Clemens (eds.). The Palgrave Handbook of Anti-Communist Persecutions. Cham: Palgrave MacMillan. pp. 329–346. ISBN 978-3-030-54963-3.
- Mania, Ulrich (2018). "Gymnasial Buildings and Sanctuaries: A Contribution to the Formation of the Palaestra and an Interpretation of the So-Called 'Echo Stoa'". In Mania, Ulrich; Trümper, Monika (eds.). Development of Gymnasia and Graeco-Roman Cityscapes (PDF). Berlin: Pro Business Digital Printing. pp. 181–196. ISBN 978-3-9819685-0-7. Archived from the original (PDF) on January 2, 2023.
- Miner, Dorothy E.; Neipen, Neda (1964). "Archaeological News". Archaeology. 17 (1): 57–66. JSTOR 41667403.
- Muskett, Georgia (2014). "The Aegean World". In Bahn, Paul (ed.). The History of Archaeology: An Introduction. Abingdon: Routledge. pp. 39–56. ISBN 978-1-317-99942-3.
- Mylonas, George E. (December 1954). "Mycenae, City of Agamemnon". Scientific American. 191 (6): 72–79. Bibcode:1954SciAm.191f..72M. doi:10.1038/scientificamerican1254-72. JSTOR 24943710.
- Mylonas, George E. (1972). Ὁ ταφικὸς Κύκλος Β τῶν Μυκηνῶν [Grave Circle B at Mycenae] (PDF) (in Greek). Vol. 1. Athens: Archaeological Society of Athens. OCLC 563477782.
- Nielsen, Inge (2009). "The Sanctuary of Artemis Brauronia: Can Architecture and Iconography Help to Locate the Settings of the Rituals?". From Artemis to Diana. Acta Hyperborea. Vol. 12. Copenhagen: Museum Tusculanum Press. pp. 83–116. ISBN 978-87-635-0788-2.
- Petrakos, Vasileios (1987). H εν Aθήναις Aρχαιολογική Eταιρεία: H ιστορία των 150 χρόνων της [The Archaeological Society of Athens: The History of Its 150 Years] (PDF). Library of the Archaeological Society of Athens (in Greek). Vol. 104. Athens: Archaeological Society of Athens. OL 47766951M.
- Petrakos, Vasileios (1993). Τριαντά χαμένα χρόνια [Thirty Lost Years] (PDF). Mentor. 8 (24): 45.
- Petrakos, Vasileios (1995). Η περιπέτεια της ελληνικής αρχαιολογίας στον βίο του Χρήστου Καρούζου [The Peripeteia of Greek Archaeology in the Life of Christos Karouzos] (PDF) (in Greek). Athens: Archaeological Society of Athens. ISBN 960-7036-47-6. Archived from the original (PDF) on October 15, 2021.
- Petrakos, Vasileios, ed. (1997a). Έπαινος Ιωάννου Κ. Παπαδημητρίου [Praise of John K. Papadimitriou] (PDF). Library of the Archaeological Society of Athens (in Greek). Vol. 168. Archaeological Society of Athens. ISBN 960-7036-70-0.
- Petrakos, Vasileios (1997b). Ιωάννης Κ. Παπαδημητρίου [John K. Papadimitriou]. Έπαινος Ιωάννου Κ. Παπαδημητρίου [Praise of John K. Papadimitriou] (PDF). Library of the Archaeological Society of Athens (in Greek). Vol. 168. Archaeological Society of Athens. pp. 9–51. ISBN 960-7036-70-0.
- Petrakos, Vasileios (1997c). Πρόλογος [Prologue]. Έπαινος Ιωάννου Κ. Παπαδημητρίου [Praise of John K. Papadimitriou] (PDF). Library of the Archaeological Society of Athens (in Greek). Vol. 168. Archaeological Society of Athens. p. 7. ISBN 960-7036-70-0.
- Petrakos, Vasileios (2007). "The Stages of Greek Archaeology". In Valavanis, Panos (ed.). Great Moments in Greek Archaeology. Athens: Kapon Press. pp. 16–35. ISBN 978-0-89236-910-2.
- Petrakos, Vasileios (2015). Ὁ πολιτικὸς Μαρινᾶτος [The Political Marinatos] (PDF). Mentor. 114: 16–49.
- Picard, Charles (1963). "J. Papadimitriou (1904–1963)". Revue Archéologique (in French). 2: 206–207. JSTOR 41753196.
- Schofield, Louise (2007). The Mycenaeans. New York: J. Paul Getty Museum. ISBN 978-0-89236-867-9.
- Stefanidis, Ioannis (2016). Stirring the Greek Nation: Political Culture, Irredentism and Anti-Americanism in Post-War Greece, 1945–1967. New York: Routledge. ISBN 978-1-351-89788-4.
- Στο φως αρχαίος τάφος με έξι αγγεία στη Βούλα [An Ancient Tomb with Six Vessels in Voula Comes to Light]. To Vima (in Greek). February 25, 2009.
- Vanderpool, Eugene (1953). "News Letter from Greece". American Journal of Archaeology. 57 (4): 281–286. doi:10.2307/501146. JSTOR 501146.
- Vanderpool, Eugene (1956). "Review: Ten White Lekythoi in the National Museum by John Kefalinos, Louisa Montesantou, George Varlamos, Nicholas Damianakis, Lucy Talcott". American Journal of Archaeology. 60 (4): 459. doi:10.2307/500887. JSTOR 500887.
- Vanderpool, Eugene (1960). "News Letter from Greece". American Journal of Archaeology. 64 (3): 265–273. doi:10.2307/502466. JSTOR 502466.
- Vasilikou, Dora (2013). Ο Ταφικός Κύκλος Β: μία ανασκόπηση [Grave Circle B: A Review]. In Petrakos, Vasileios (ed.). Γεώργιος Εμμ. Μυλωνάς: Βίος και έργο 1898–1988 [George Emm. Mylonas: His Life and Work 1898–1988]. Library of the Archaeological Society of Athens (in Greek). Archaeological Society of Athens. pp. 55–84. ISBN 978-618-5047-09-2.
- Vogeikoff-Brogan, Natalia (February 2, 2017). "The Spirit of St. Louis Lives in Athens, Greece". From the Archivist's Notebook.
- Vogeikoff-Brogan, Natalia (April 2, 2018). "The Riding Goddess of Mycenae". From the Archivist's Notebook.
- Zoridis, Pantelis (1977). Η σπιλιά των Νυμφών της Πεντέλης [The Cave of the Nymphs at Penteli] (PDF). Αρχαιολογική Εφημερίς [Archaeological Journal]. Αρχαιολογικά Χρονικά́, pp. 4–11.
