= Roda =

Roda may refer to:

== Places ==
- Stadtroda (called Roda until 1925), a town in Thuringia, Germany
- Roda, Greece, a village in Corfu, Greece
- Roda, Khushab, a village and Union Council in Punjab, Pakistan
- Roda, Portugal, a village in Viseu district, Portugal
- Roda de Berà, a municipality in Catalonia, Spain
- Roda de Eresma, a municipality in Castile and León, Spain
- Roda de Isábena, a town in Aragon, Spain
- Roda de Ter, a municipality in Catalonia, Spain
- La Roda, a small city in Castile-La Mancha, Spain
- Roda, Virginia, an unincorporated community in Wise County, Virginia, United States
- Roda Group of Temples in Gujarat, India
- Roda Island, an island in Cairo, Egypt

== People ==
- Roda (name)

== Sports ==
- Roda '46, a football club in Leusden, Netherlands
- Roda JC, a football club in Kerkrade, Netherlands
- FC Roda Moscow, a football club in Moscow, Russia

== Other uses ==
- Roda (formation), an Afro-Brazilian form of dancing events
- Roda (river), a river in Thuringia, Germany
- RodA, a protein
- Códice de Roda, a collection of ancient and medieval manuscripts from Roda de Isábena
