= Antonios Keramopoulos =

Greek archaeologist

- Αντώνιος Κεραμόπουλος
- Born: 1870; Vlasti, Greece, Ottoman Empire
- Died: 13 May 1960 (aged 89–90); Athens
- Occupation: Archaeologist

Antonios Keramopoulos (Greek: Αντώνιος Κεραμόπουλος; 1870 – 13 May 1960) was a Greek archaeologist born in Vlasti, then in the Ottoman Empire. He conducted numerous excavations studying Mycenean and classical Greek antiquities during the early 20th century, including excavations at the Agora of Athens, the palace of Mycenae and at Thebes. He also wrote studies about later Greek history. Among other things, he became known as a proponent of the theory of an autochthonous Greek origin of the Vlachs in Greece.

In 1911, Keramopoulos excavated part of a large peristyle complex in the Agora of Athens, which may have been the city's Prytaneion. In 1926, he excavated a medieval cemetery in Thebes, making in the process the earliest known study of post-Roman pottery in Greece. 1952, he was appointed by John Papadimitriou to a committee overseeing the excavation of Grave Circle B at Mycenae, which had been discovered the previous year. He died in Athens on 13 May 1960.
