= Archaeological Museum of Epidaurus =

Coordinates: 37°35′49″N 23°4′25″E

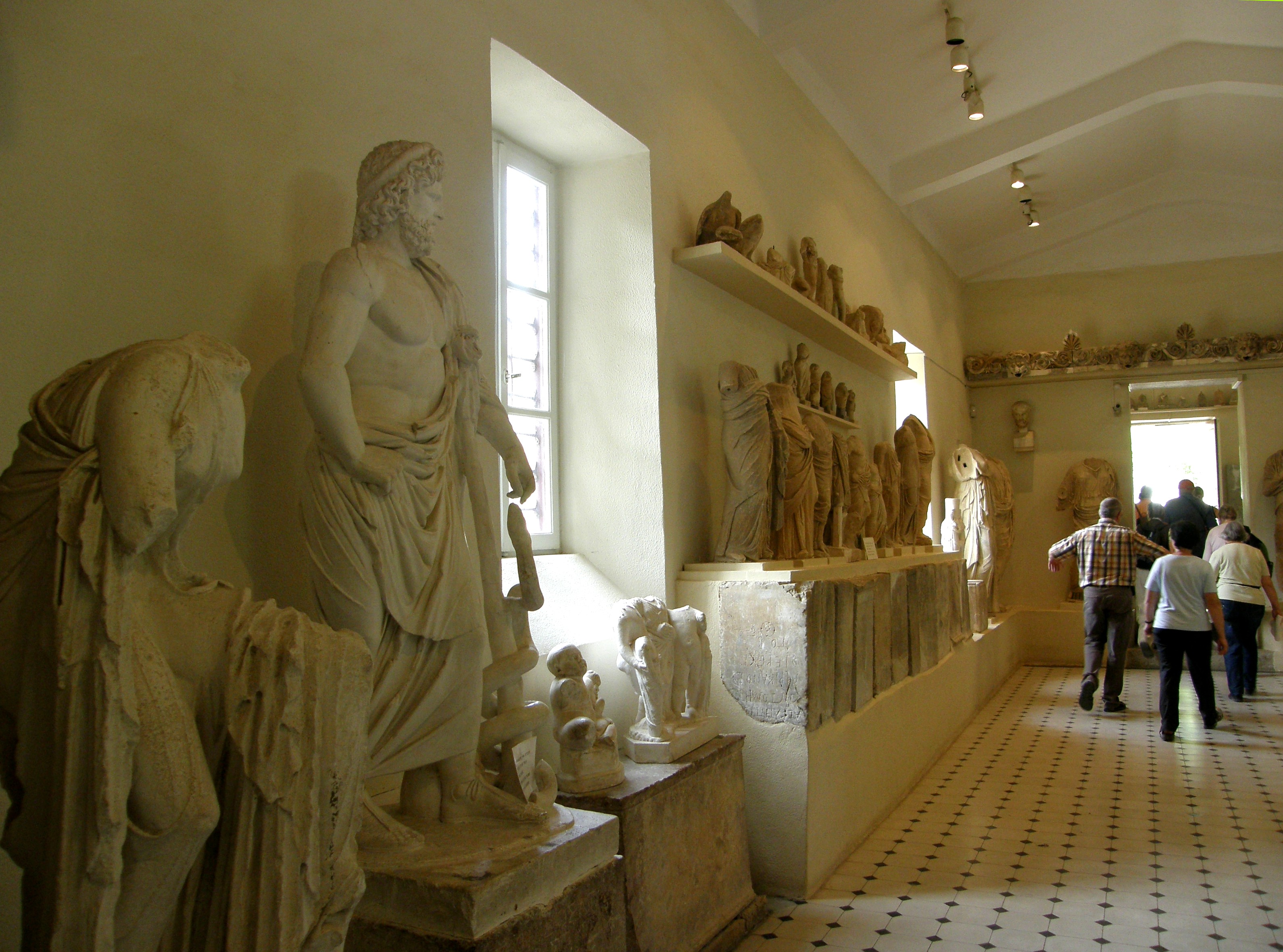
- Established: 1902
- Location: Epidaurus, Argolis, Peloponnese, Greece
- Type: Archaeological museum

Archaeological Museum of Epidaurus is a museum in Epidaurus, in Argolis on the Peloponnese peninsula, Greece. The museum, noted for its reconstructions of temples and its columns and inscriptions, was established in 1902 and opened in 1909 to display artifacts unearthed in the ancient site of Epidaurus in the surrounding area.

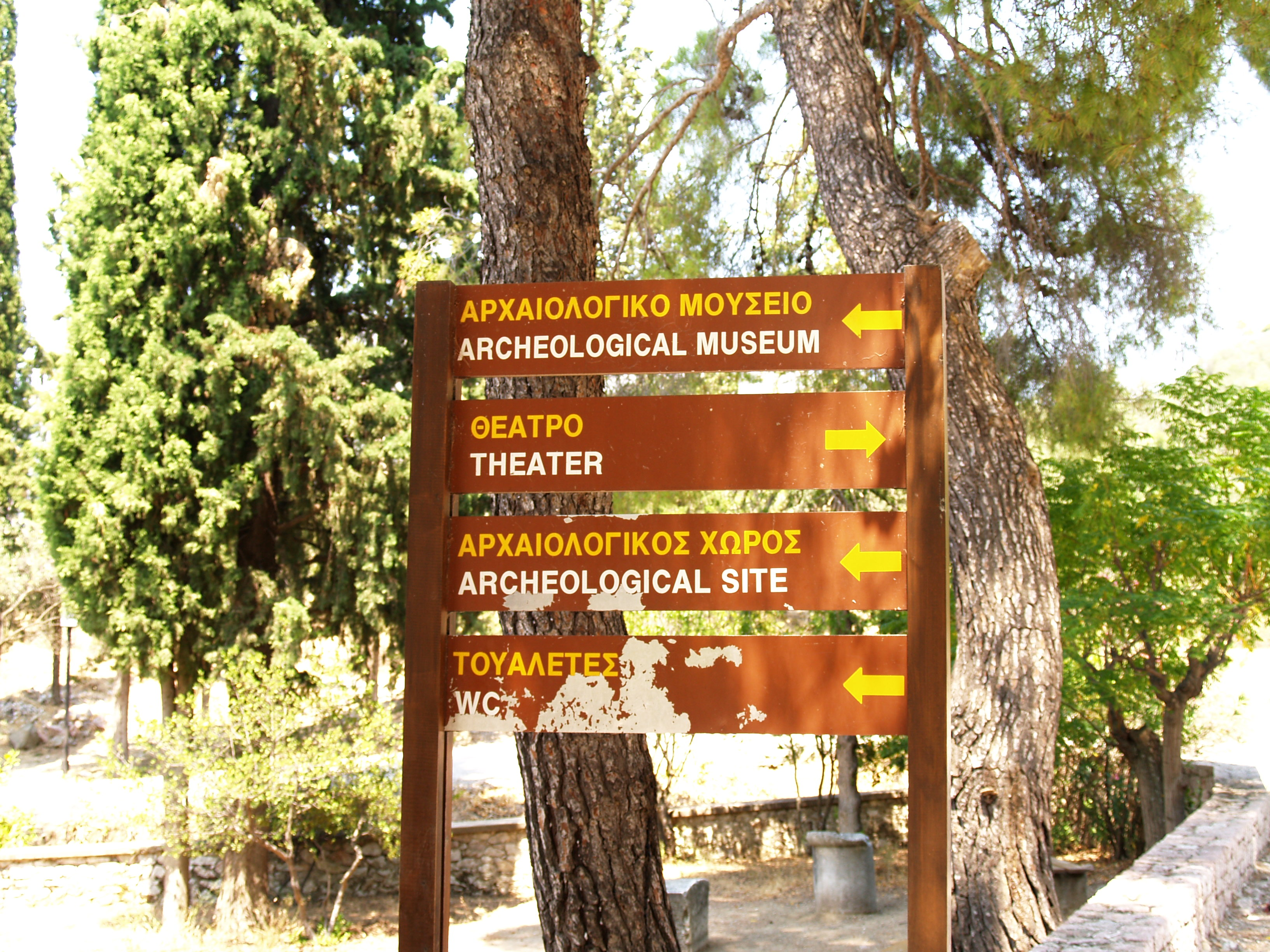
Epidaurus sites
