= Sanctuary of Apollo Maleatas =

Archaeological site near Epidaurus, Greece

Coordinates: 37°35′58″N 23°05′08″E

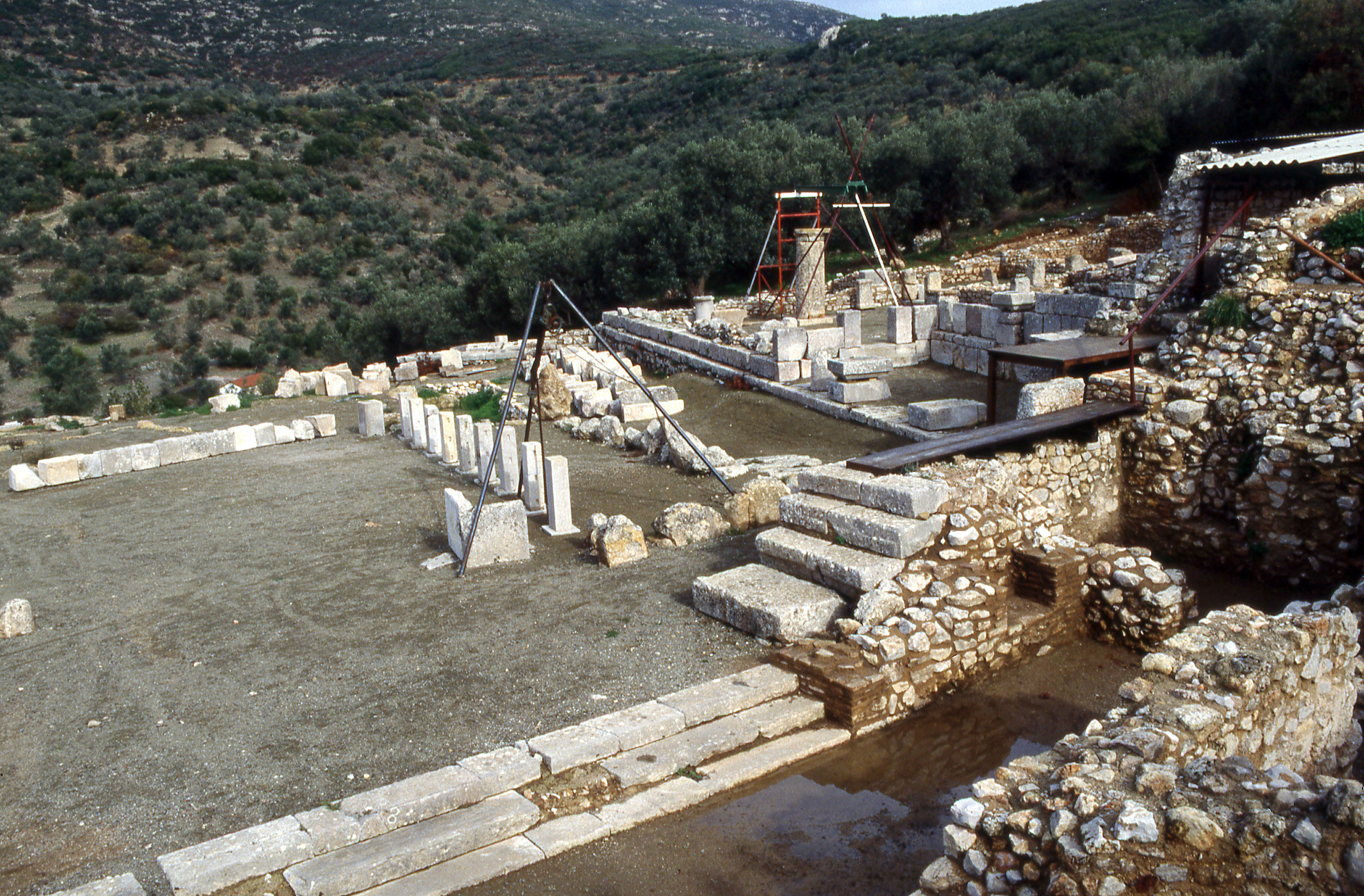
View of the sanctuary of Apollo Maleatas in 1990

The Sanctuary of Apollo Maleatas (Greek: Ἀπόλλων Μαλεάτας) is located on a low hill on Mount Kynortion, east of the sanctuary of Asklepios at Epidaurus.

At the peak of the hill was a small Early Helladic settlement, which was never built on in later periods. At the beginning of the Late Bronze Age, an open-air altar was used where animals were sacrificed and votives deposited in the ash. Dedications include votive bronze double axes, bronze swords, and clay animal figurines. There is evidence for cult activity in the Geometric period.

Most of the structures on the site belong to the 4th century BC or to the 2nd century AD, when there was a major building campaign paid for by Sextus Iulius Maior Antoninus Pythodorus, an aristocrat from Nysa, Anatolia and a Roman senator. Pausanias, who visited the sanctuary in the third quarter of the 2nd century, described his contributions:

"Above the sacred grove [of Asklepios at Epidauros] is another mountain called Kynortion, on which there is a sanctuary of Apollo Maleatas. The sanctuary itself is ancient, but everything about it, including the cistern in which the rain-water is collected, is a gift of Antoninus to the Epidaurians."

The temple could not have been in operation after the 4th or 5th century CE when all pagan shrines were closed during the persecution of pagans in the late Roman Empire.

Remains on the site include Roman baths, an underground cistern, a Roman fountain, a small Doric temple of Apollo (4th century BC), an altar, a shrine of the muses, living quarters for the sanctuary staff, a Roman gateway, and a stoa (late 4th century BC).

From 1881 until his death in 1928, Panagiotis Kavvadias excavated at Epidaurus, though he made only a cursory investigation of the Sanctuary of Apollo Maleatas. Between 1948 and 1951, John Papadimitriou systematically excavated the site.
