= Roda, Greece =

Village in Thinalio, Corfu, Greece

Coordinates: 39°47′N 19°47′E

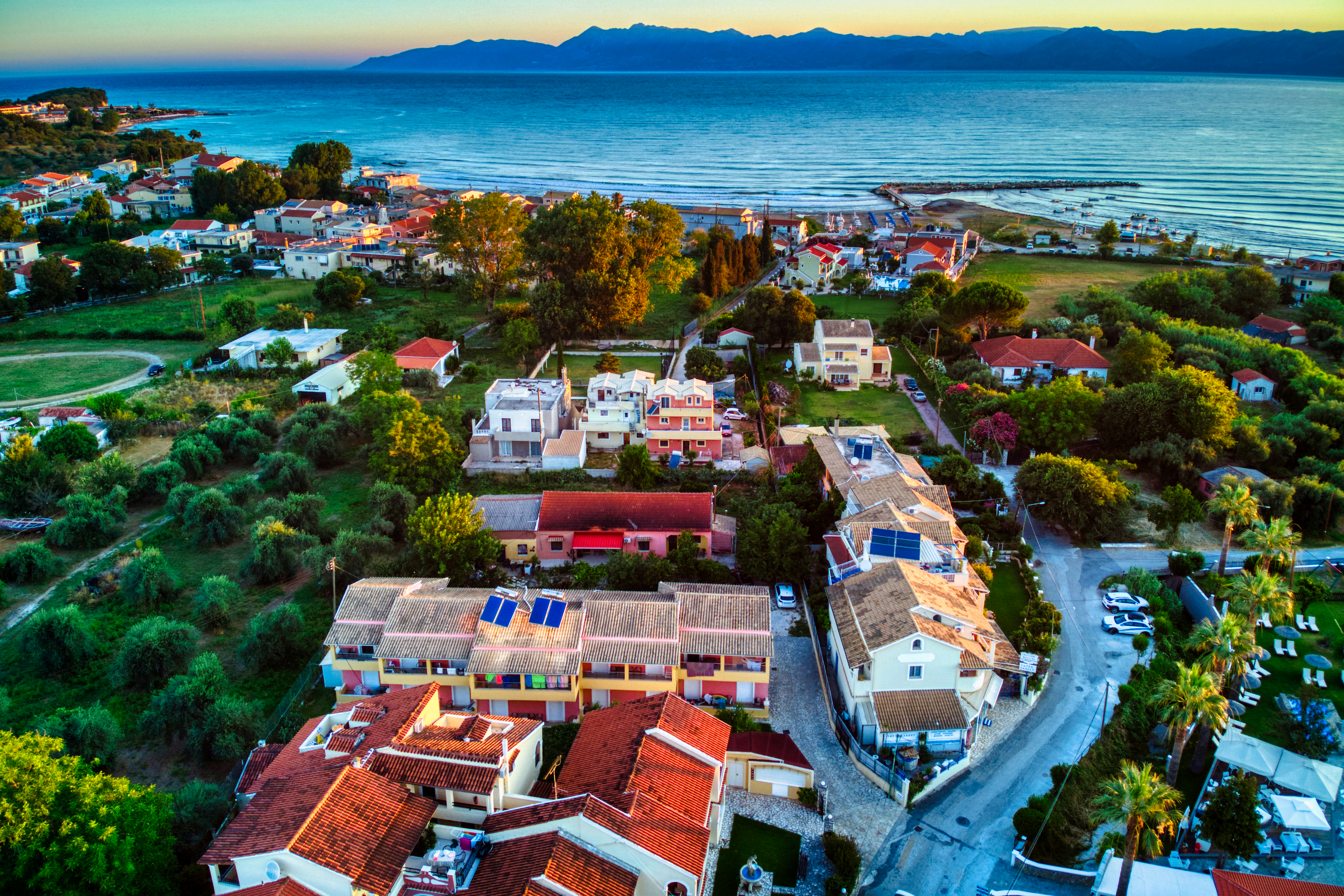
Roda, Corfu

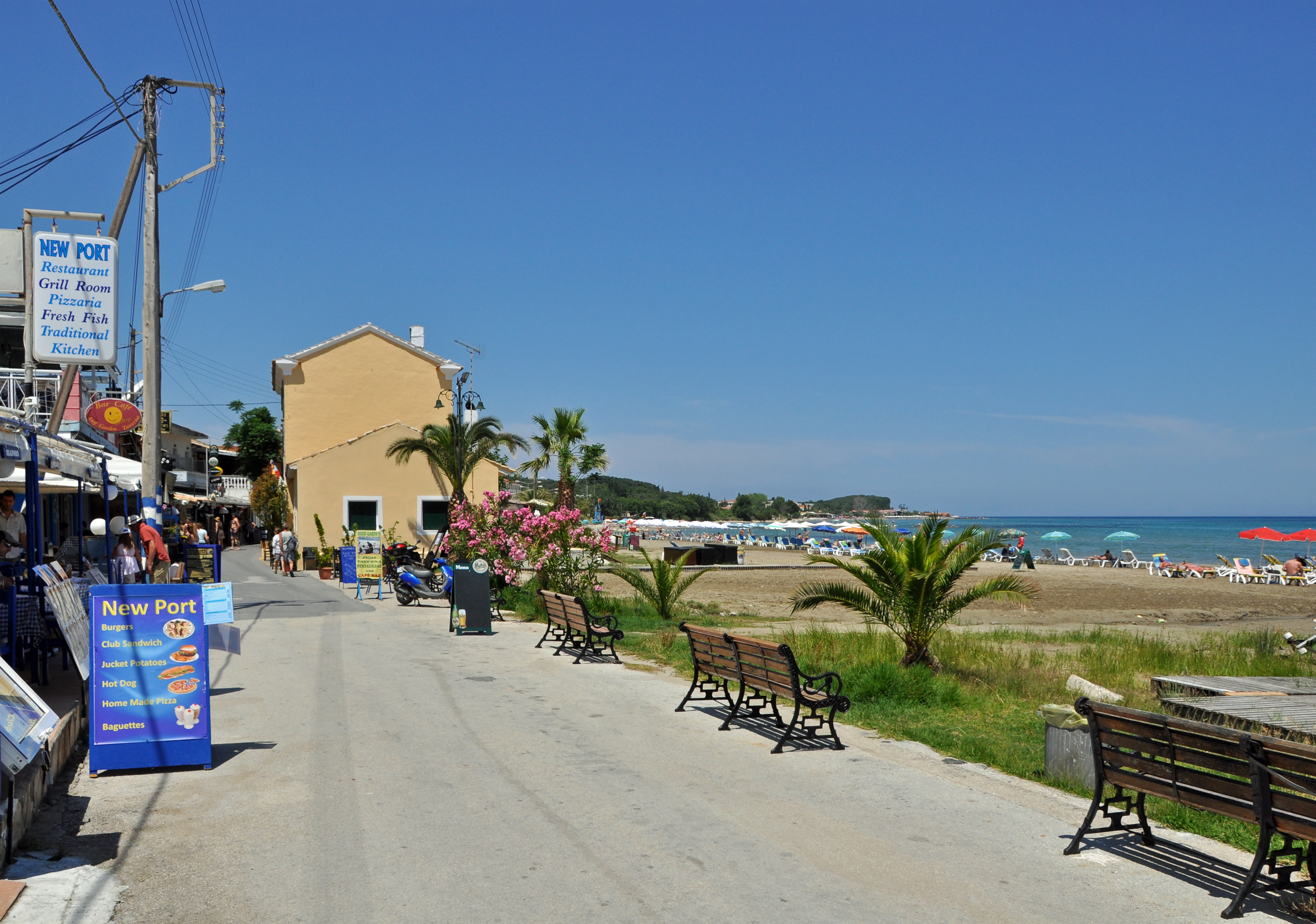
Roda: beach promenade

Roda is a Greek village mainly designed for summertime tourism. The village becomes almost a ghost town in the winter.

The village is at the centre of the north coast of the Greek island of Corfu, about 2 kilometers from Acharavi and 34 kilometers from Corfu (city) and Corfu Airport. It normally opens up in May and closes down for winter around October.
