= Athanasios Rhousopoulos =

Greek antiquarian and antiquities dealer (1823–1898)

- Αθανάσιος Ρουσόπουλος
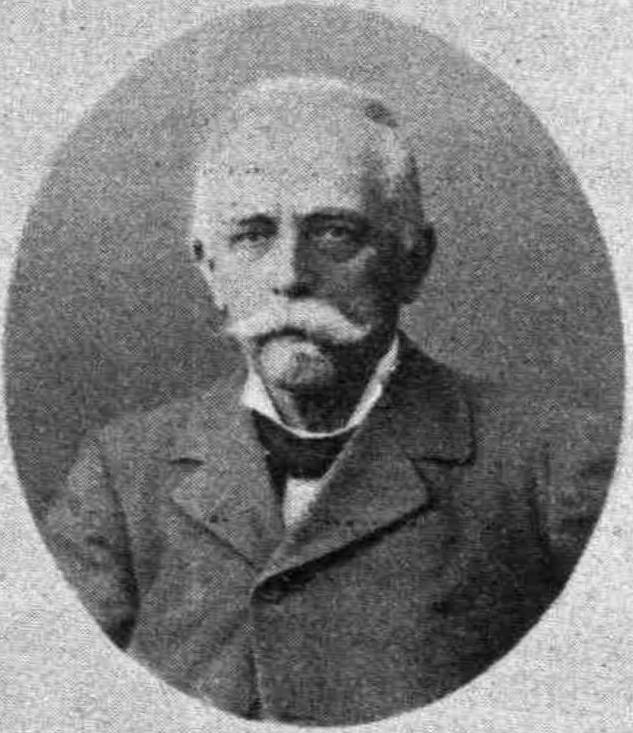
- Born: Athanasios Sergiou Rhousopoulos; 1823; Vogatsiko, Ottoman Empire
- Died: 13 December [O.S. 1 December] 1898 (aged 74–75); Athens, Kingdom of Greece
- Known for: Antiquities collecting; Antiquities crime
- Spouse: Louisa Murray
- Children: 9

Academic background
- Education: Leipzig University; Friedrich Wilhelm University, Berlin; University of Göttingen
- Thesis: De Zamolxide secundum veterum auctoritatem (1852)

Athanasios Sergiou Rhousopoulos (Greek: Αθανάσιος Σεργίου Ρουσόπουλος) (1823 – 13 December [O.S. 1 December] 1898 (Note: Greece adopted the Gregorian calendar in 1923; 28 February [O.S. 15 February] was followed by 1 March. In this article, this date and all subsequent dates are given in the 'New Style' Gregorian calendar, while dates before it are given in the 'Old Style' Julian calendar.)) was a Greek archaeologist, antiquities dealer and university professor. He has been described as "the most important Greek collector and dealer between the 1860s and 1890s", and as "a key figure in the early days of archaeology in Greece."

Born in 1823 in a region of northern Greece under the Ottoman Empire, Rhousopoulos was educated in Constantinople and Athens before receiving financial support from the antiquarian and philanthropist Konstantinos Bellios to pursue formal archaeological training in Germany. In 1853, he returned to Greece to work as a teacher, before being appointed to a post at the University of Athens in 1855. He wrote and translated numerous educational works concerning Greek history, culture and archaeology.

Rhousopoulos played a significant role in the foundation of the National Archaeological Museum of Athens, and was a prominent member of the Archaeological Society of Athens, itself an important fixture in Greek archaeology during his lifetime. He excavated in Athens's Theatre of Dionysus as well as in the Kerameikos, where his 1863 discovery of the Grave Stele of Dexileos helped to confirm that the site was that of Athens's ancient cemetery. He attracted controversy in the early 1870s for his criticism of the German archaeologist Heinrich Schliemann, and of Schliemann's claim to have found artefacts from the Trojan War at the site of Hisarlik.

Rhousopoulos was renowned for his collection of ancient artefacts, particularly coins, which was considered among the most impressive private collections in Greece. He was also a prominent dealer of antiquities, trading regularly with collectors, museums and society figures from around the world, and heavily involved in the illegal excavation and trafficking of ancient artefacts. From 1865, his activities came to increasing public and official attention, particularly that of the Ephor General, Panagiotis Efstratiadis; Rhousopoulos was fined after his illegal sale of the Aineta aryballos to the British Museum, and expelled from the Archaeological Society.

Dismissed from his academic post in 1884 for reasons that remain unclear, Rhousopoulos died in 1898. He made significant contributions to Greek epigraphy, and was a major source of artefacts for several of the world's largest museums. In the twenty-first century, study of his extensive correspondence, particularly with the British scholars George Rolleston and Arthur Evans, has provided important evidence for the practice of archaeology and antiquities trading in nineteenth-century Greece.

== Early life and education ==
Athanasios Sergiou Rhousopoulos was born in 1823, in the village of Vogatsiko, near Kastoria in the northern Greek region of Macedonia, then part of the Ottoman Empire. (Note: The region was occupied by Greece in 1912, during the First Balkan War, and formally annexed by the Treaty of Bucharest in 1913.) He received his early education in Constantinople and Athens.

In 1846, Konstantinos Bellios, a wealthy Greek merchant and antiquarian then living in Vienna, funded Rhousopoulos to attend Leipzig University and the Friedrich Wilhelm University in Berlin. He studied Greek literature and archaeology, before moving to the University of Göttingen, which awarded him a doctorate in 1852. Rhousopoulos wrote his thesis, entitled De Zamolxide secundum veterum auctoritatem (On Zalmoxis, According to the Authority of the Ancients), in Ancient Greek. It was the first doctoral dissertation ever written on Zalmoxis, a Thracian deity mentioned by the ancient Greek historian Herodotus.

== Academic career ==
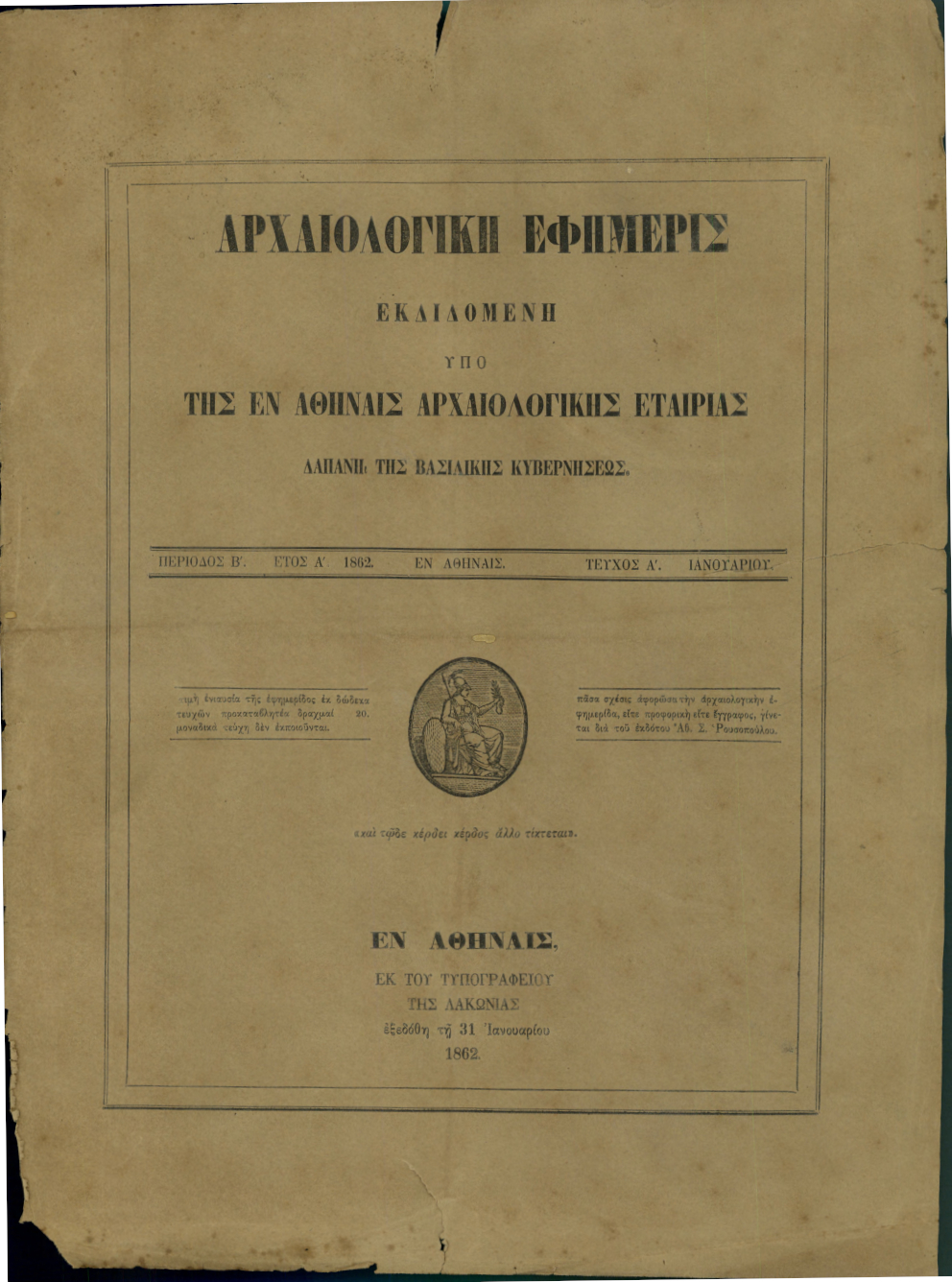
The cover of the first edition of the 'new series' of the Archaeological Journal (Greek: Αρχαιολογική Εφημερίς, romanized: Archaiologiki Efimeris), edited by Rhousopoulos and dated 12 February [O.S. 31 January] 1862

In 1853, Rhousopoulos returned to Greece. From 1855 until 1858, he worked as a teacher in the First Gymnasium (secondary school) of Patras, in the northern Peloponnese. During his time in Patras, he translated the Danish philologist Ernst Bojesen's Handbook of Greek Antiquity (German: Handbuch der griechischen Antiquitäten) into Greek for use as a school textbook. He also taught Greek for twenty-four years at the Rizarios Ecclesiastical School of Athens, and spent four years teaching ancient Greek civilisation at the Athens Polytechnic.

In 1855, he was appointed to a temporary professorship of Greek at the University of Athens. In the same year, he published Manual of Greek Archaeology, a textbook which has been situated within the early-nineteenth-century trend for archaeological works relying primarily on literary sources rather than material culture to reconstruct the past. In 1857, he constructed a house for himself on Lycabettus Street in central Athens, excavating in the process three hundred ancient tombs on the site. His professorship was made permanent in 1860.

The Archaeological Society of Athens, a learned society founded in 1837, had significant responsibility for archaeological work and heritage management in Greece throughout the 19th century. It had stagnated and all but disbanded between April 1854 and 1858, under pressure from its own financial troubles and a cholera outbreak that had killed its president, Georgios Gennadios. The society reformed in 1858: in 1859, Rhousopoulos was elected to its governing council, as the only member of the council with a background in archaeology rather than philology. In 1862, the society re-established the Archaeological Journal (Greek: Αρχαιολογική Εφημερίς, romanized: Archaiologiki Efimeris), which published news of excavations and of the activities of the society and of the Greek Archaeological Service. Rhousopoulos was the head of publications for its first twelve issues. His eleven articles in the Journal focused primarily on Greek literature and culture, with only a few on archaeology.

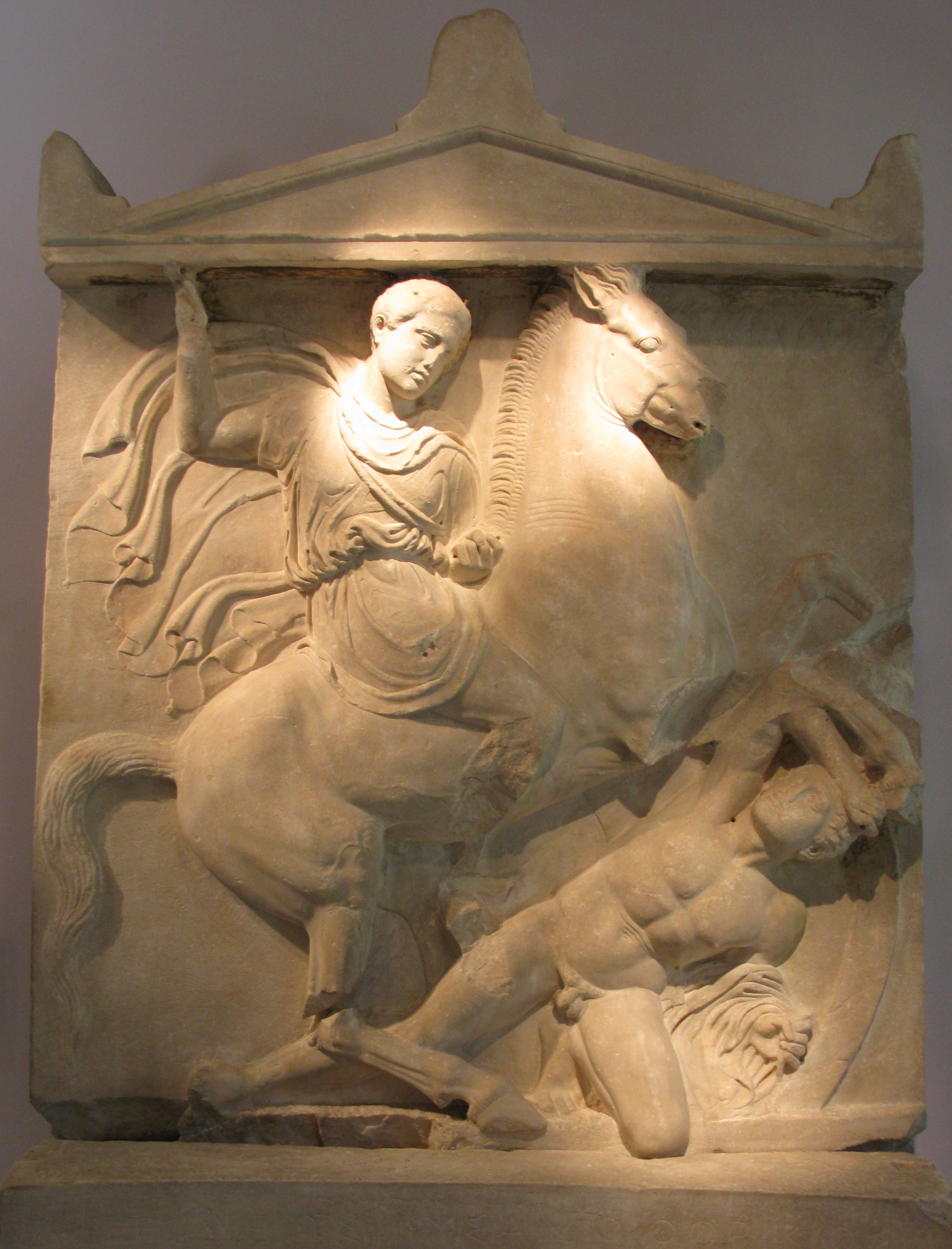
This grave stele, erected for the Athenian cavalryman Dexileos c. 394 BCE, was excavated by Rhousopoulos in 1863 and helped to prove the location of the Kerameikos cemetery.

During the 1860s and 1870s, he was involved in the foundation of the National Archaeological Museum in Athens, which eventually opened in 1893. In 1864, he was selected by the Ministry of Education and Religious Affairs to serve on a committee to identify a suitable location for what became the National Archaeological Museum, which included prominent archaeological figures such as Panagiotis Efstratiadis, Stefanos Koumanoudis and Alexandros Rizos Rangavis. Rhousopoulos worked on categorising the materials transferred to the new museum from other institutions around Greece.

Rhousopoulos's discovery in the spring of 1863 of the Grave Stele of Dexileos, alongside the contemporary excavation of the nearby funerary enclosure of Agathon, helped to identify the location of the ancient Athenian cemetery known as the Kerameikos. (Note: Petrakos 2007, p. 22. For Rhousopoulos as the architect of the discovery, see Petrakos 2011, p. 138) In 1866, excavations conducted by Rhousopoulos and his fellow archaeologist Petros Pervanoglou near the Theatre of Dionysus on the slopes of the Acropolis of Athens uncovered a marble sphere, approximately 0.91 metres (3.0 ft) in circumference, inscribed with images of the god Helios and magical inscriptions.

In 1868, Rhousopoulos was moved from his professorship in Greek to one in archaeology at the University of Athens. He was unusual among Athens's early archaeological professors for not having worked for the Greek Archaeological Service. On 22 October [O.S. 10 October] 1884, Rhousopoulos was dismissed from his post. The reasons for his dismissal are uncertain: the Greek newspaper Skrip (Σκριπ) reported that he had left his post "on account of old age". The archaeologist and archaeological historian Yannis Galanakis has, however, suggested that Rhousopoulos was more likely dismissed on grounds of ill health, given that his age of 61 was relatively young, though little information about his health is available.

=== Relationship with Heinrich Schliemann ===
Rhousopoulos has been described as "a particularly vehement critic" of Heinrich Schliemann, the German archaeologist who excavated the site of Hisarlik (Troy) in various phases between 1871 and 1890.

On 30 August [O.S. 18 August] 1873, the German newspaper Neue Hannoversche Zeitung published a report of a conversation between Rhousopoulos and a number of his friends while he had been visiting Hannover. The newspaper reported the comment that the so-called Treasure of Priam, which Schliemann had excavated in May of that year, was "undoubtedly one of the most important [finds] of its kind", but that the period to which it belonged was uncertain; separately, the article quoted the judgement that Schliemann's find had "self-evidently nothing to do with the Treasure of Priam." Although it was unclear from the Neue Hannoversche Zeitung's report which, if any, of these remarks had been made by Rhousopoulos himself, as opposed to his conversation partners, the report attracted a bitter response from W. Gosrau, the court chaplain of George I of Greece, who accused Rhousopoulos of having "driven the learned gentlemen wild" out of "bread-envy" (German: Brodneid). In November, the Hannoverscher Courier, a rival newspaper of the Neue Hannoversche Zeitung, defended Rhousopoulos, pointing out that the alleged remarks could not be securely attributed to him, and accusing Gosrau of "a complete lack of tact" and "unwarranted arrogance."

During his first informal exhibition of the finds from Troy at his house on Mouson Street in Athens in 1873, (Note: Not the so-called Iliou Melathron, more famously known as Schliemann's Athenian house, which was not constructed until 1880.) Schliemann invited all of Athens to visit, so that they could, in his words, "convince themselves with their own eyes of the atrocious calumnies" of Rhousopoulos, to whom he referred as "that foul fiend." Modern scholarship considers Schliemann's 'Treasure of Priam' to date to the Early Bronze Age (c. 3100 – c. 2000 BCE), several centuries earlier than the putative date of the mythical Priam's reign as king of Troy (c. 1250 BCE). (Note: Although belief in the historicity of the Trojan War was widespread following Schliemann's discoveries in the nineteenth century, modern scholarship generally considers that the characters and events of the Trojan War myth have no recoverable historical basis.) In 1879, Rhousopoulos examined a key that Schliemann had found at Troy, writing him what Schliemann described as "a valuable note" on its design and the symbolism of its decoration.

== Antiquities collecting and trading ==
Galanakis has called Rhousopoulos "the most important Greek collector and dealer between the 1860s and 1890s". In 1873, his collection was described by the German scholar Friedrich Wieseler as among the most remarkable in Greece, second only to that of the Russian consul-general Peter Alexandrovich Saburov – which, according to the archaeological historian Angeliki Kokkou, "exceeded the limits and possibilities of a private collection". Rhousopoulos was particularly noted for his numismatic collection of ancient coins, which numbered over 6,000 objects by 1874. Saburov moved his collection to Berlin in 1880, and had sold it by 1884; in 1885, the Austrian consul in Corfu, Alexander von Warsberg, described Rhousopoulos's collection as the richest in Athens.

=== Antiquities dealership ===
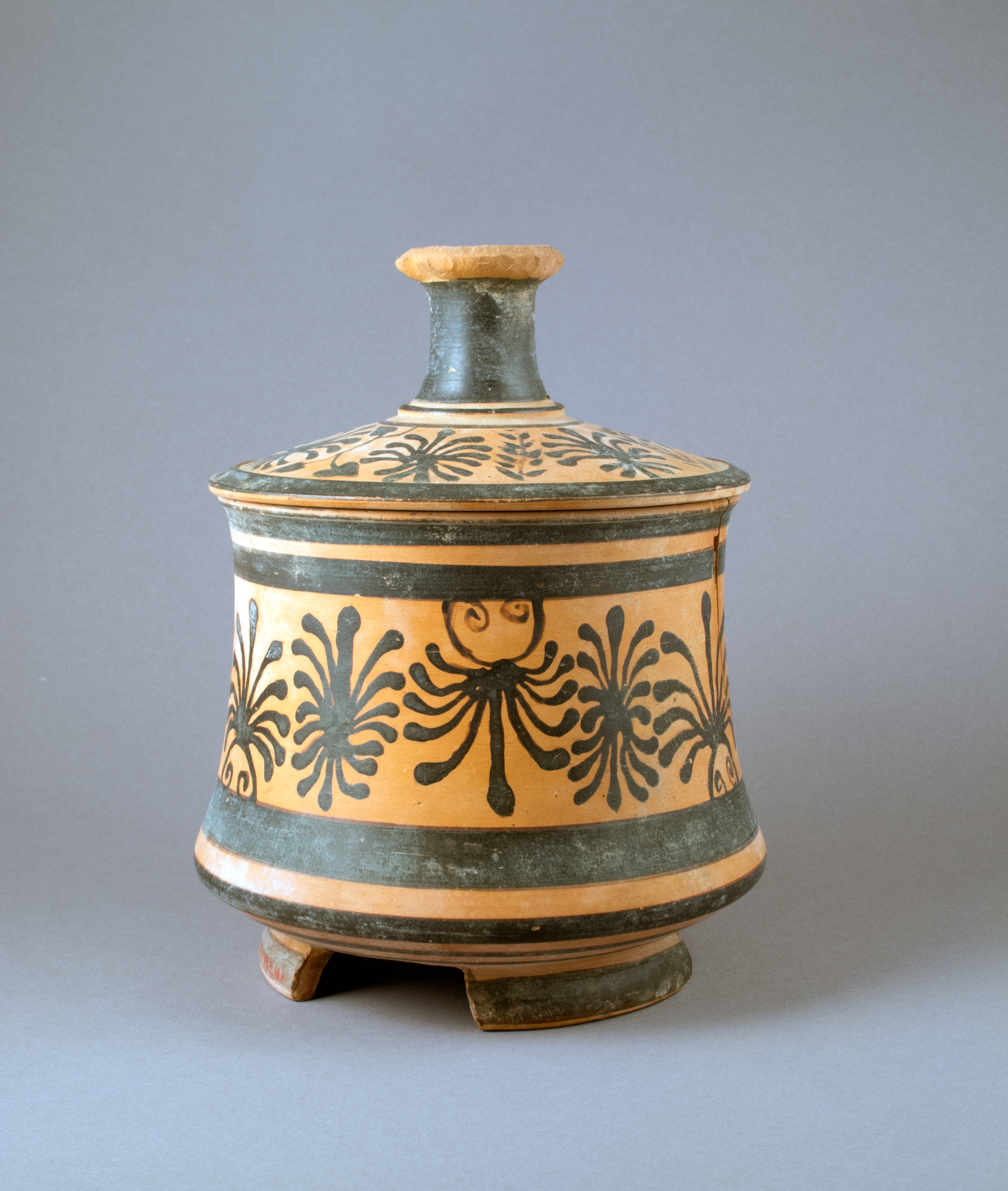
A Boeotian pyxis excavated in Athens, sold by Rhousopoulos to Samuel G. Ward in 1874, who donated it to the Metropolitan Museum of Art

Rhousopoulos was registered as an art dealer until 1893, though it is unclear when he began to practise. By the early 1870s, his collection included 3,000 Neolithic stone tools, including two complete stone axes. Between 1873 and 1874, Rhousopoulos unsuccessfully tried to sell his stone artefacts for £120 (equivalent to £9,668 in 2021) to George Rolleston, professor of anatomy and physiology at Oxford University. Rolleston did, however, purchase an assemblage of bones and artefacts from Rhousopoulos in 1871, paying a total of 475 francs (around £19, equivalent to £1,563 in 2021). The assemblage included seven ancient skulls, which Rolleston wanted for his phrenological research into the ancestral links between the modern and ancient populations of Greece. Rolleston ordered another skull from Rhousopoulos in 1873, and donated all eight to Oxford University's Ashmolean Museum in 1874. Between these two purchases, Rhousopoulos and Rolleston maintained what Galanakis has called "an amicable correspondence". Rolleston travelled to Athens to view Rhousopoulos's antiquities in his home, and Rhousopoulos travelled to Oxford to visit Rolleston in his.

Rhousopoulos's collection and dealership made him a fixture of Athenian high society. An 1884 guidebook to Athens, produced by the British publisher John Murray, listed Rhousopoulos's collection as a must-see for archaeologically minded visitors to Athens. Rhousopoulos opened his house to invited viewers between 2pm and 5pm each day, and offered any item for sale, though commentators noted that his prices were considerably higher than those charged by other dealers in Athens, London and Paris. His home was often visited by high-status foreign travellers, including Emperor Pedro II of Brazil in 1876 and Empress Elisabeth of Austria in 1891.

Rhousopoulos sold several items to major European and American museums, including London's British Museum. In the early 1870s, he sold sixty-two gems, which he identified as "Graeco-Phoenician", for £240 (equivalent to £19,335 in 2021) to Charles Newton, then keeper of the museum's Greek and Roman antiquities. Later, in 1884, he sold four Tanagra figurines to the museum for a total of £760 (equivalent to £61,229 in 2021), two of which were later found to be forgeries. (Note: Tanagra figurines have been described as a "systematically looted" class of artefacts, following the demand for them among nineteenth-century western collectors. Around 10,000 graves in the necropolis of Tanagra, where the figurines are found, were illegally excavated during the early 1870s.) The following year, having spent two years negotiating with Rhousopoulos over its price, the museum bought from him a mirror with a scene of the goddess Nike sacrificing a bull, paying 80,000 francs (around £320, equivalent to £25,780 in 2021). He may have played a significant role in the trade in ancient pinakia (voting-plates), of which only a handful have survived to modern times. On 30 August [O.S. 18 August] 1871, he purchased one such pinakion that had been illegally excavated from a tomb at Profitis Ilias, near the Panathenaic Stadium: Galanakis has suggested that Rhousopoulos may have been involved in the sale of many other pinakia now found in European museum collections.

Rhousopoulos is the only Athenian art dealer who can be definitively placed as supplying Cretan seal-stones to Arthur Evans, keeper of the Ashmolean Museum, who collected these objects as part of his early studies into the Minoan writing systems later known as Cretan hieroglyphs and Linear A. Galanakis has suggested that Evans may have purchased further stones from Jean Lambros, a rival dealer to Rhousopoulos. In 1888, Rhousopoulos sold twenty-one vases, terracotta statues and bronze statues to the American philanthropist Jane Stanford, which would form part of the early collection of the Stanford University Museum of Art. (Note: Osborne, Turner & Mozley 1986, p. 17. For the Rhousopoulos purchase among the early Stanford Museum collection, see Lewis 2020, pp. 54–55.)

=== Sale of Rhousopoulos's antiquities ===
Rhousopoulos died in Athens on 13 December [O.S. 1 December] 1898. His numismatic collection, described in 2008 by the numismatist Alan S. Walker as "truly encyclopaedic", was sold in 1905 by the Munich auctioneer Jacob Hirsch. Hirsch divided the collection into 4,627 individual lots, producing what Walker describes as "the largest and best illustrated auction catalogue to have appeared up to that time" to accompany the auction. Though Hirsch did not name Rhousopoulos as the previous owner of the coins, his identity was an open secret among many of the buyers. Other objects from Rhousopoulos's collection were purchased by collectors and museums around the world, including several potsherds – of minimal commercial value – which are, as of 2013, held by the Antikenmuseum of Heidelberg University.

== Antiquities crime ==
The archaeological historian Nikolaos Papazarkadas has written that Rhousopoulos "was heavily involved in dubious transactions involving illegally-excavated antiquities". Rhousopoulos once opined, in 1861, that the Greek nation had "no need of new antiquities", but rather to catalogue and protect those "scattered in every corner of the city [of Athens]" – which, he claimed, were "wearing out, disappearing, and being stolen." The archaeologist Helen Hughes-Brock has written that Rhousopoulos had some connection with the illegal excavation of a chamber tomb at Kara on Mount Hymettus on Crete. Some time before 1896, he paid forty drachmae to Georgios Ghiouroukis, an excavator from the Cycladic island of Melos, to carry out an illegal excavation in the southwest part of the site of Phylakopi, searching for obsidian tools. The excavation was halted by the authorities after three days; Ghiouroukis later called this the "best day's pay that had ever been earned in Melos in the memory of man". (Note: By way of comparison, Rhousopoulos earned 350 drachmae a month from his professorship at Athens in 1859.) In a letter to Rolleston, Rhousopoulos boasted of being able to call upon "all the Athens grave-diggers (Greek: τυμβωρύχοι, romanized: tymborychoi, lit. 'grave-diggers') (Note: Galanakis and his co-author Stella Skaltsa point out that the name τυμβωρύχοι literally means grave-diggers, but that it had carried negative connotations of robbery since antiquity and, by the 1870s, "clearly referred to people who dig up tombs in order to despoil them." However, Galanakis and Nowak-Kemp elsewhere note that the term could also be used more neutrally, since τυμβωρύχοι often worked on legal excavations with the permission of the Ephor General.) who dig for tombs throughout Attica".

In 1896, the numismatist Ioannis Svoronos wrote a pamphlet, entitled Light upon Archaeological Scandals (Φως επί των αρχαιολογικών σκανδάλων), in which he accused Rhousopoulos of being an "antiquities looter" (Greek: αρχαιοκάπηλος, romanised: archaiokapilos, lit. 'antiquities trader'); (Note: This term, likely coined around the 1860s, was used to describe an art dealer involved in the illegal export of antiquities: Galanakis and Skaltsa translate it as "antiquities looter".) as part of a broader set of accusations that the Ephor General, Panagiotis Kavvadias, (Note: Kavvadias had been appointed in 1885, following the retirement of Efstratiadis in 1884 and the death of his successor, Panagiotis Stamatakis, in 1885.) had failed to address antiquities crime and been inappropriately friendly towards archaeological criminals. (Note: Specifically, Svoronos criticised Kavvadias over his handling of the 1887 theft of several coins from the Numismatic Museum of Athens, over which Kavvadias had dismissed both Svoronos and the museum's director, Achilleus Postolakas, accusing them of involvement in the theft. Svoronos had previously been briefly imprisoned after Kavvadias sued him for insulting remarks Svoronos made about him at the Archaeological Society's general assembly on 4 August [O.S. 23 July] 1895.) Rhousopoulos sued Svoronos for libel in response.

=== Sale of the Aineta aryballos ===
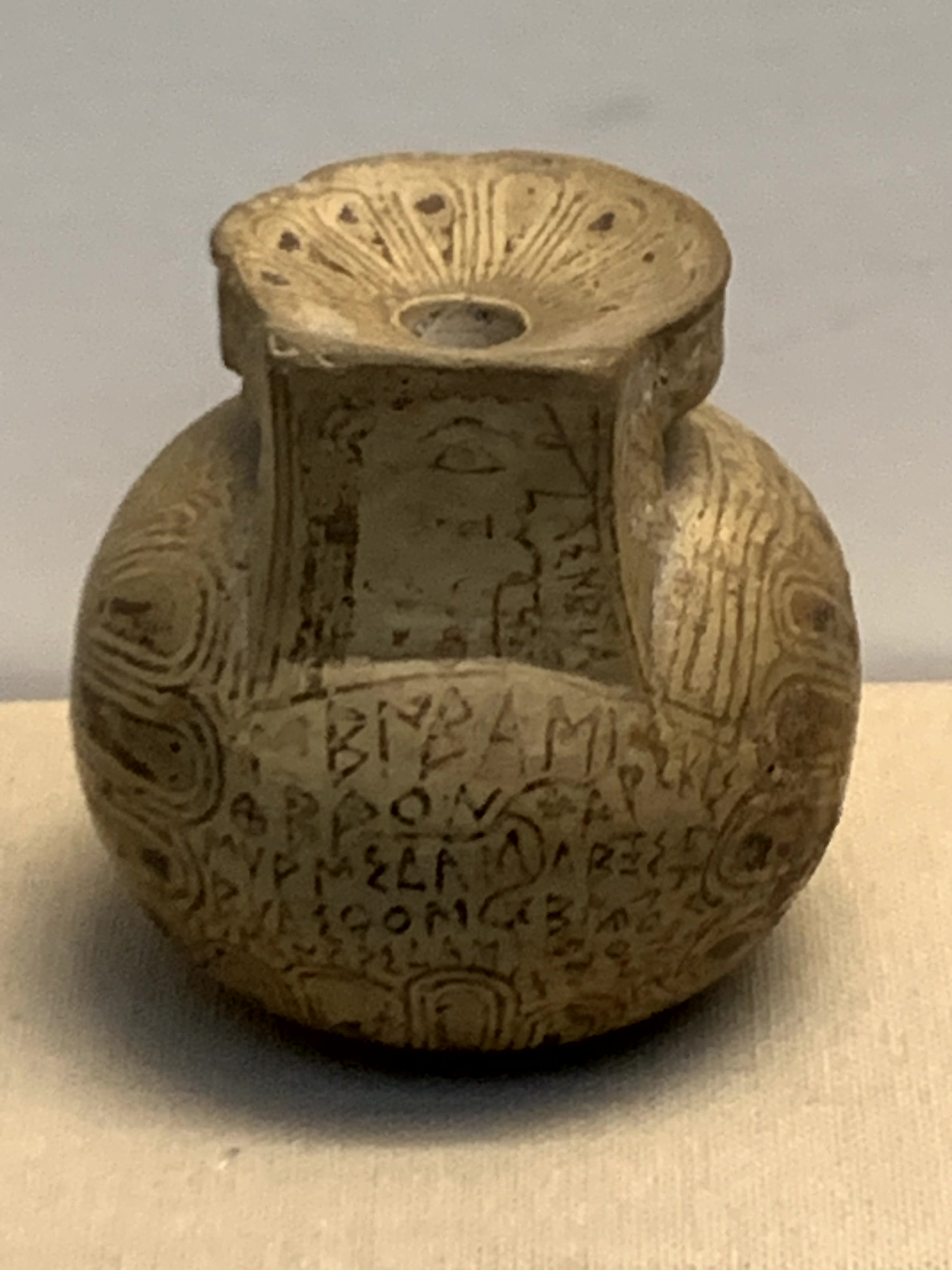
The Aineta aryballos in the British Museum

In 1862, Rhousopoulos published an article in the journal of the German Archaeological Institute at Rome on a Corinthian aryballos, now known as the Aineta aryballos, which had been excavated in Athens. (Note: The article is Rhousopoulos 1862.) This article was possibly the first on epigraphical matters written by any Greek in a foreign journal. Rhousopoulos sold the aryballos to the British Museum for 1,000 drachmae in 1865, (Note: British Museum 2020. For the price, Galanakis 2012d.) via Charles Merlin, a British banker and diplomat resident in Athens who often acted as an intermediary for antiquities purchases. Charles Newton had previously selected the aryballos for purchase, and subsequently received it from Merlin.

In 1865, Efstratiadis, by this point the Ephor General in charge of the Greek Archaeological Service, (Note: Efstratiadis had assumed the office in 1864, following the death of Kyriakos Pittakis.) had written in his diary of the size and richness of Rhousopoulos's antiquities collection, marking the first time that Rhousopoulos's activities had come to official attention. The main law governing antiquities was the Archaeological Law of 22 May [O.S. 10 May] 1834, which has been described as "loosely interpreted and even more loosely enforced". Under the 1834 law, private excavators – often known as "grave-robbers" – required the permission of the Ephor General to excavate, but he was required to grant that authorisation if the excavation took place on private land and had the landowner's consent. Furthermore, antiquities discovered in such excavations were considered the joint property of the state and the private excavators, and would be shared between the landowners and the excavators. Such artefacts could be sold overseas, provided that their owners secured the judgement of a state committee of three experts that the object was "useless" to Greek museums. Rhousopoulos failed to secure this permission, but wrote to defend himself in the newspaper Elpis (Ελπις) on 16 February [O.S. 4 February] 1867, arguing that the aryballos was "of no artistic value, the size of an apple, only valued for 25 drachmae". Efstratiadis, meanwhile, denounced Rhousopoulos as a "university professor; antiquities looter".

Efstratiadis's ability to respond to Rhousopoulos's breach of the law was limited: the state had limited financial, human and legal resources to address the illegal excavation and trade of antiquities, and his superiors in government had little political will to do so. He also needed to maintain good relations with Athens's art dealers, who undertook more excavations in this period than either the Archaeological Service or the closely-aligned Archaeological Society of Athens, and usually offered to sell the artefacts they uncovered to the state. Furthermore, Rhousopoulos was periodically a member of the appraising committee of three, and often acted as a consultant to it, further limiting Efstratiadis's ability to use the state's archaeological apparatus against him.

Rhousopoulos was, however, fined 1,000 drachmae (the same as the price for which he had sold the aryballos) later in 1867 for exporting antiquities without the Ephor General's permission. His actions were condemned by the Minister for Education and Religious Affairs, who oversaw the Archaeological Service, and by the Archaeological Society of Athens, which expelled him at some point in the 1870s. According to Galanakis and the archaeological historian Magalosia Nowak-Kemp, Rhousopoulos subsequently "went to great lengths" to operate outside the knowledge and scrutiny of the state. For instance, he asked Evans, to whom he had sold numerous gems and seal-stones (Note: On the seal-stones, see Galanakis 2014, p. 90.) over a period of years, to ensure that his name was not mentioned in any publication involving the objects or their excavation. When the presence of these artefacts in Oxford became known in 1894, the Greek newspaper Hestia (Ἑστία) expressed its bafflement as to how such objects had left Greece, and other parts of the Greek press criticised Evans for his purchases.

== Personal life and family ==
Rhousopoulos married the German Louisa Murray, whom he had met while a student at Göttingen. Murray's family were of Scottish descent and may have migrated to Germany around the time of the 1707 Acts of Union between Scotland and England. They had nine children. One of their daughters died in 1897; they had four other daughters – Agnes, Sophia, Bertha and Martha – and four sons: Othon, Asterios, Roussos and Petros. According to Galanakis and Nowak-Kemp, Murray likely assisted Rhousopoulos in writing letters in English, which he did only rarely.

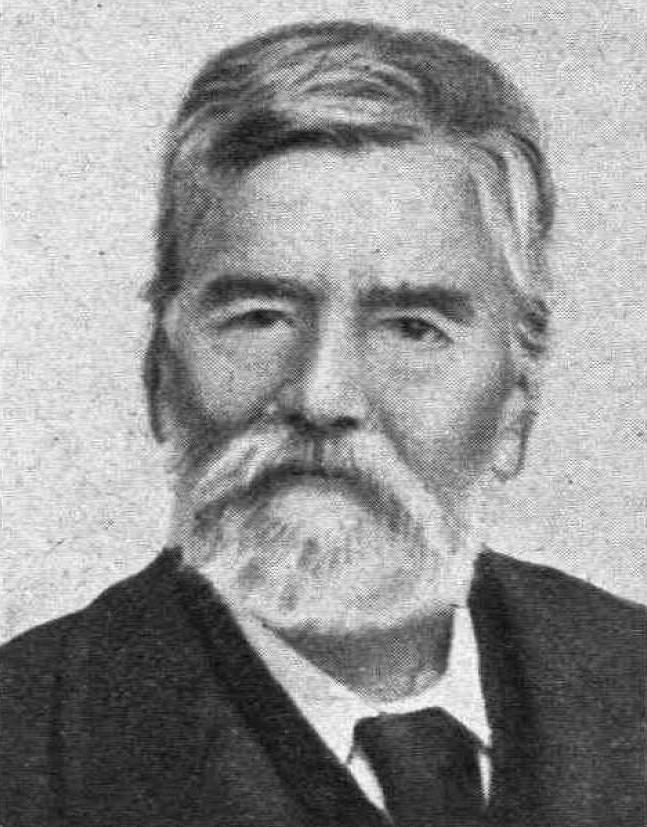
Stefanos Koumanoudis, who opposed Rhousopoulos's view of the desirability of selling ancient Greek antiquities overseas

Othon, born in 1856, became a chemist at the National Archaeological Museum, and has been credited as one of the most important figures in the early history of archaeological conservation. Roussos, meanwhile, was born in 1854 and became the Modern Greek tutor of Empress Elisabeth of Austria; he visited Corfu with her in 1889. In March 1891, Elisabeth appointed him as Professor of Greek Language at the Orientalischen Handelsakademie in Budapest, and he later became Professor of Greek at the University of Budapest, serving until the end of the First World War and dying in 1954.

After his death, Rhousopoulos became the father-in-law of the German classical archaeologist Ernst Pfuhl, who married Sophia Rhousopoulos in 1904. (Note: Schefold 1943, p. 92. For the date of 1904, see Galanakis and Skaltsa 2012, n. 48) The two met while Pfuhl was excavating on the Cycladic island of Thera. Sophia may also have sent impressions of some Cretan seal-stones to Arthur Evans, who received impressions of examples in her father's collection after Rhousopoulos's death.

Rhousopoulos was known to be cosmopolitan, multilingual and well-connected in European society, particularly in German-speaking countries. Stefanos Koumanoudis, his contemporary in the Archaeological Society of Athens, and fellow professor (of Latin) at the University of Athens, described Rhousopoulos in 1846 as "antiquities-mad" (αρχαιομανής). Rhousopoulos defended his sale of Greek antiquities as a way of protecting Greek heritage and promoting its standing abroad – a view contested by the Archaeological Society and by Koumanoudis, who co-authored a pamphlet in 1872 with Philippos Ioannou, the society's president, calling on Greeks to use their "intelligence and patriotism" by refraining from looting or exporting antiquities. (Note: Galanakis 2012d. The pamphlet itself is Ioannou & Koumanoudis 1872; the quoted text is from p. 7.)

== Honours and legacy ==
Rhousopoulos was elected as a member of the Académie Française, to whom he dedicated his book Treatise on an Icon of Antigone (Πραγματείαν περὶ εἰκόνος τῆς ᾿Αντιγόνης).

Papazarkadas has described Rhousopoulos as "a competent philologist" and judged that "his epigraphical publications were as good as any studies of the mid-nineteenth century." According to Galanakis and Nowak-Kemp, Rhousopoulos was unusual among Athenian art dealers of his time for his "academic approach", by which he attempted to impress the archaeological importance of his wares upon his potential buyers, using his knowledge of the archaeological literature and debates of the day. Hughes-Brock has described him as "a key figure in the early days of archaeology in Greece", while Galanakis has described him as a "founding father" of Athens's National Archaeological Museum.

Rhousopoulos's detailed notes on the excavations with which he was connected – often unpublished and unmentioned in the academic archaeological press, given their informal and often illegal nature – have allowed the reconstruction of several of these excavations, including early digs in the Kerameikos cemetery. His extensive correspondence, particularly with Rolleston, has also been used to reconstruct the networks and dynamics of the trade in and collection of ancient artefacts in late nineteenth-century Athens.

== Selected publications ==
- Bojesen, Ernst Frederik (1860). Ελληνική αρχαιολογία: προς στοιχειώδη μάθησιν των πολιτευμάτων και του βίου της αρχαίας Ελλάδος [Greek Archaeology: For Elementary Education in the Cultures and the Life of Ancient Greece] (in Greek). Translated by Rhousopoulos, Athanasios Sergiou. Athens: Andreos Koromila. OCLC 9234330.
- Rhousopoulos, Athanasios Sergiou (1896). Das Monument des Themistokles in Magnesia [The Monument of Themistokles in Magnesia] (in German). Athens: P. D. Sakellarios. OCLC 26445259.
- — (1863). "Scavi nel Ceramico (ἁγία τριας) d'Atene" [Excavations in the Kerameikos of Athens]. Bullettino dell'Instituto di Corrispondenza Archeologica (in Italian): 161–173.
- — (1862). "Sopra un vasetto corinzio con iscrizioni d'un carattere antichissimo" [On a Small Corinthian Vase with Inscriptions of a Most Ancient Character]. Annali dell'Instituto di Corrispondenza Archeologica (in Italian). 34: 46–56.
- — (1862). Σκεύη δικαστικά [Judicial Tools]. Αρχαιολογική Εφημερίς (in Greek): 304–307.
- — (1861). Εισαγωγή εις τον Θουκυδίδην δια τους μαθητάς της Ριζαρείου Εκκλησιαστικής Σχολής προ πάντων [Introduction to Thucydides, for the Students of the Rizarios Ecclesiastical School Above All] (in Greek). Athens: Publishing House of Laconia. OCLC 10327229.
- — (1855). Ελληνικής αρχαιολογίας εγχειρίδιον: Τούτο μεν εξελληνισθέν, τούτο δε εκ των πηγών συνταχθέν και εκδοθέν προς χρήσιν των γυμνασίων [Handbook of Greek Archaeology: Translated into Greek, Compiled from the Sources and Put Together for the Use of High-School Students] (in Greek). Patras: P. Efmorphopoulos and G. Stavropoulos. OCLC 794646701.

== Sources ==
- Anderson, Frank Maloy; Hershey, Amos Shartle (1918). "The Treaty of Bucharest, August 10, 1913". Handbook for the Diplomatic History of Europe, Asia, and Africa 1870–1914. Washington, DC: National Board for Historical Service, Government Printing Office.
- Baker, Abigail (2019). Troy on Display: Scepticism and Wonder at Schliemann's First Exhibition. London: Bloomsbury. ISBN 978-1-350-11429-6.
- British Museum (28 April 2020). "Aryballos". The British Museum. Archived from the original on 5 February 2023.
- Delatte, Armand L. (1913). "Études sur la magie grecque : I. Sphère magique du Musée d'Athènes" [Studies on Greek Magic: I. Magical Sphere from the Athens Museum]. Bulletin de Correspondance Hellénique (in French). 37: 247–278.
- Easton, D.F. (1994). "Priam's Gold: The Full Story". Anatolian Studies. 44: 221–243. doi:10.2307/3642994. JSTOR 3642994. S2CID 163743485.
- Fotiadis, Michael (2016). "Aegean Prehistory Without Schliemann". Hesperia. 85 (1): 91–119. doi:10.2972/hesperia.85.1.0091. JSTOR 10.2972/hesperia.85.1.0091. S2CID 163340690.
- Galanakis, Yannis; Nowak-Kemp, Malgosia (2011). "Ancient Greek Skulls in the Oxford University Museum, Part I: George Rolleston, Oxford and the Formation of the Human Skulls Collection". Journal of the History of Collections. 24 (1): 89–104. doi:10.1093/jhc/fhq039.
- Galanakis, Yannis; Nowak-Kemp, Malgosia (2013). "Ancient Greek Skulls in the Oxford University Museum, Part II: The Rhousopoulos–Rolleston Correspondence". Journal of the History of Collections. 25 (1): 1–17. doi:10.1093/jhc/fhq040.
- Galanakis, Yannis; Skaltsa, Stella (2012). "Tomb Robbers, Art Dealers, and a Dikast's Pinakion from an Athenian Grave". Hesperia. 81 (4): 619–653. doi:10.2972/hesperia.81.4.0619. JSTOR 10.2972/hesperia.81.4.0619. S2CID 163987166.
- Galanakis, Yannis (2008). "Doing Business: Two Unpublished Letters from Athanasios Rhousopoulos to Arthur Evans in the Ashmolean Museum, Oxford". In Kurtz, Donna; Meyer, Caspar; Saunders, David; Tsingarida; Athena; Harris, Nicole (eds.). Essays in Classical Archaeology for Eleni Hatzivassiliou 1977–2007. Oxford: British Archaeological Reports. pp. 297–309. ISBN 978-1-4073-0284-3.
- Galanakis, Yannis (2011). "An Unpublished Stirrup Jar from Athens and the 1871–2 Private Excavations in the Outer Kerameikos". Annual of the British School at Athens. 106: 167–200. doi:10.1017/S0068245411000074. JSTOR 41721707. S2CID 162544324.
- Galanakis, Yannis (17 October 2012a). "Guns, Drugs, and the Trafficking of Antiquities: Archaeology in 19th-century Greece". Center for Hellenic Studies Research Bulletin. Harvard University. Archived from the original on 31 March 2023.
- Galanakis, Yannis (15 November 2012b). "Of Grave Hunters & Earth Contractors: A Look at the "Private Archaeology" of Greece". Center for Hellenic Studies Research Bulletin. Harvard University. Archived from the original on 31 March 2023.
- Galanakis, Yannis (30 November 2012c). "On Her Majesty's Service: C.L.W. Merlin and the Sourcing of Greek Antiquities for the British Museum". Center for Hellenic Studies Research Bulletin. Harvard University. Archived from the original on 4 February 2023.
- Galanakis, Yannis (31 October 2012d). ""University Professor – Antiquities Looter"?". Center for Hellenic Studies Research Bulletin. Harvard University. Archived from the original on 31 March 2023.
- Galanakis, Yannis (2013). "Early Prehistoric Research on Amorgos and the Beginnings of Cycladic Archaeology". American Journal of Archaeology. 117 (2): 181–205. doi:10.3764/aja.117.2.0181. JSTOR 10.3764/aja.117.2.0181. S2CID 193297984.
- Galanakis, Yannis (2014). "Arthur Evans and the Quest for the "Origins of Mycenaean Culture"". In Bennet, John; Wilkinson, Toby; Galanakis, Yannis (eds.). Athyrmata: Critical Essays on the Archaeology of the Eastern Mediterranean in Honour of E. Susan Sherratt. Oxford: Archaeopress. pp. 85–98. ISBN 978-1-78491-019-8.
- Gilberg, Mark (1997). "Alfred Lucas: Egypt's Sherlock Holmes". Journal of the American Institute for Conservation. 36 (1): 31–48. doi:10.1179/019713697806113620. JSTOR 3180082.
- Grotefend, C.L.; Kestner, H.; Kraut, C; Oessterley, C. (5 November 1873). "Der Schatz des Priamus" [The Treasure of Priam]. Hannoverscher Courier (in German). p. 1.
- Hughes-Brock, Helen (2020). "Two Cushions, a Bes, a Boar and a Bead: New 'Discoveries' in the Aegean Collection at the Ashmolean". In Sekunda, Nicholas (ed.). Wonders Lost and Found: A Celebration of the Archaeological Work of Professor Michael Vickers. Oxford: Archaeopress. pp. 8–17. ISBN 978-1-78969-382-9.
- Ioannou, Philippos; Koumanoudis, Stefanos (1872). Ο περί αρχαιοτήτων Νόμος και αι σχετικαί προς αυτόν εγκύκλιοι υπουργικαί και άλλα τινα [The Law on Antiquities and the Related Ministerial Circulars and Other Matters] (in Greek). Athens: Archaeological Society of Athens. OL 47766941M. Archived from the original on 6 May 2023.
- Κηδεία Ρουσοπούλου [Funeral of Rhousopoulos]. Σκριπ (Skrip) (in Greek). 3 December 1898.
- Kiminas, Demetrius (2009). The Ecumenical Patriarchate. San Bernardino: Wildside Press. ISBN 978-1-4344-5876-6.
- Kokkou, Angeliki (1977). Η μέριμνα για τις αρχαιότητες στην Ελλάδα και τα πρώτα μουσεία [The Care of Antiquities in Greece and the First Museums] (in Greek). Athens: Hermes Press. pp. 199–201. ISBN 978-960-6878-11-4.
- Konstantinidi-Syvridi, Eleni; Paschalidis, Constantinos (2019). "The Unacknowledged Panayotis Stamatakis and his Invaluable Contribution to the Understanding of Grave Circle A at Mycenae". Archaeological Reports. 65: 111–126. doi:10.1017/S0570608419000061. JSTOR 26867451. S2CID 213645599.
- Korfmann, Manfred (1986). "Beşik Tepe: New Evidence for the Period of the Trojan Sixth and Seventh Settlements". In Angel, John Lawrence; Mellink, Machteld Johanna (eds.). Troy and the Trojan War: A Symposium Held at Bryn Mawr College, October 1984. Bryn Mawr: Bryn Mawr College. pp. 17–28. ISBN 978-0-929524-59-7.
- Lewis, David Frazer (2020). "Architecture of the Mind: Imparting Californian Identity Through Architectural Experience on the Early Stanford University Campus". In Gillin, Edward; Joyce, R. Horatio (eds.). Experiencing Architecture in the Nineteenth Century: Buildings and Society in the Modern Age. London: Bloomsbury Academic. pp. 45–60. ISBN 978-1-350-15970-9.
- MacDonald, Colin F. (2007). "Knossos: The Discovery of the Minoan Palace". In Valavanis, Panos (ed.). Great Moments in Greek Archaeology. Athens: Kapon Press. pp. 158–183. ISBN 978-0-89236-910-2.
- Marinov, Tchavdar (2013). "Ancient Thrace in the Modern Imagination: Ideological Aspects of the Construction of Thracian Studies in Southeast Europe (Romania, Greece, Bulgaria)". In Daskalov, Roumen; Marinov, Tchavdar (eds.). Entangled Histories of the Balkans: Volume Three: Shared Pasts, Disputed Legacies. Leiden: Brill. pp. 10–117. ISBN 978-90-04-29036-5.
- Metropolitan Museum of Art (4 April 2023). "Pyxis with lid". Archived from the original on 19 April 2023.
- Morris, Ian (1992). Death-Ritual and Social Structure in Classical Antiquity. Cambridge: Cambridge University Press. ISBN 978-0-521-37611-2.
- Moungoulia, Andreas (2001). Το Α΄ Γυμνάσιον εν Πάτραις: ιστορική και εκπαιδευτική διαδρομή [The 1st Gymnasium in Patras: Historical and Educational Path] (in Greek). Patras: Ektypotiki Attikis. ISBN 960-91579-0-4.
- Osborne, Carol Margot; Turner, Paul Venable; Mozley, Anita Ventura (1986). Museum Builders in the West: The Stanfords as Collectors and Patrons of Art, 1870–1906. Palo Alto: Stanford University Museum of Art, Stanford University. ISBN 978-0-937031-10-0.
- Papazarkadas, Nikolaos (2014). "Epigraphy in Early Modern Greece". Journal of the History of Collections. 26 (3): 399–412. doi:10.1093/jhc/fhu018.
- Petrakos, Vasileios (1987). H Εν Aθήναις Aρχαιολογική Eταιρεία: H ιστορία των 150 χρόνων της [The Archaeological Society of Athens: The History of its 150 Years] (in Greek). Athens: Archaeological Society of Athens. OL 47766951M.
- Petrakos, Vasileios (1995). Η περιπέτεια της ελληνικής αρχαιολογίας στον βίο του Χρήστου Καρούζου [The Adventure of Greek Archaeology in the Life of Christos Karouzos] (in Greek). Athens: Archaeological Society of Athens. ISBN 978-960-7036-47-6.
- Petrakos, Vasileios (2007). "The Stages of Greek Archaeology". In Valavanis, Panos (ed.). Great Moments in Greek Archaeology. Athens: Kapon Press. pp. 16–35. ISBN 978-0-89236-910-2.
- Petrakos, Vasileios (2011). Η εν Αθήναις Αρχαιολογική Εταιρεία. Οι Αρχαιολόγοι και οι Ανασκαφές 1837–2011 (Κατάλογος Εκθέσεως) [The Archaeological Society of Athens. The Archaeologists and the Excavations 1837–2011] (in Greek). Athens: Archaeological Society of Athens. ISBN 978-960-8145-86-3.
- Reinach, Salomon (1928). "Panagiotis Kavvadias". Révue Archéologique. 5 (in French). 28: 128–130. JSTOR 23910488.
- Rubalcaba, Jill; Cline, Eric H. (2011). Digging for Troy: From Homer to Hisarlik. Watertown, MA: Charlesbridge. ISBN 978-1-58089-326-8.
- Schefold, Karl (1943). "Ernst Pfuhl". Basler Jahrbuch: 84–100. Archived from the original on 19 April 2023.
- Schliemann, Heinrich (1880). Ilios: The City and Country of the Trojans: The Results of Researches and Discoveries on the Site of Troy and Through the Troad in the Years 1871–72–73–78–79. Including an Autobiography of the Author. Vol. 1. London: John Murray. OCLC 877970757.
- Shelmerdine, Cynthia (2008). "Introduction: Background, Methods and Sources". In Shelmerdine, Cynthia (ed.). The Cambridge Companion to the Aegean Bronze Age. Cambridge: Cambridge University Press. pp. 1–18. doi:10.1017/CCOL9780521814447. ISBN 978-1-139-00189-2.
- Sherratt, Susan (2005). "Archaeological Contexts". In Foley, John Myles (ed.). A Companion to Ancient Epic. Chichester: Wiley. pp. 119–141. ISBN 978-1-4051-8838-8.
- Skokos, Konstantinos (1900). Αθανάσιος Ρουσόπουλος [Athanasios Rhousopoulos]. Imerologion Skokou. Vol. 15. pp. 367–368. Archived from the original on 21 March 2023.
- Smith, David Michael (2023). "Coarse Labours Long Continued: Cooking Vessels, Culinary Technology and Prehistoric Foodways at Phylakopi, Melos". In Papadoupoulos, Angelos; Smith, David Michael; Cavanagh, William G. (eds.). The Wider Island of Pelops: Studies on Prehistoric Aegean Pottery in Honour of Professor Christopher Mee. Oxford: Archaeopress. pp. 217–239. ISBN 978-1-80327-329-7.
- Svoronos, Ioannis (1896). Φως επί των αρχαιολογικών σκανδάλων [Light upon the Archaeological Scandals] (in Greek). Athens: Perri Brothers. OL 47766955M. Archived from the original on 2 May 2019.
- Verhagen, Kya (2016). "De Tanagra-figurines: een mysterie ontrafeld" [The Tanagra Figurines: A Mystery Unravelled]. Tijdschrift voor Mediterrane Archeologie (in Dutch). 28 (55): 13–19.
- Walker, Alan S. (2008). "Catalogues and their Collectors". American Journal of Numismatics. 20: 597–615. JSTOR 43580331.
- Whitley, James (2020). "Homer and History". In Pache, Corinne Ondine; Dué, Casey; Lupack, Susan; Lamberton, Robert (eds.). The Cambridge Guide to Homer. Cambridge: Cambridge University Press. pp. 257–266. doi:10.1017/9781139225649. ISBN 978-1-1070-2719-0. S2CID 212932139.
