= Grave Relief for Eutaxia and Artemisios =

Hellenistic carving (2nd century BCE)

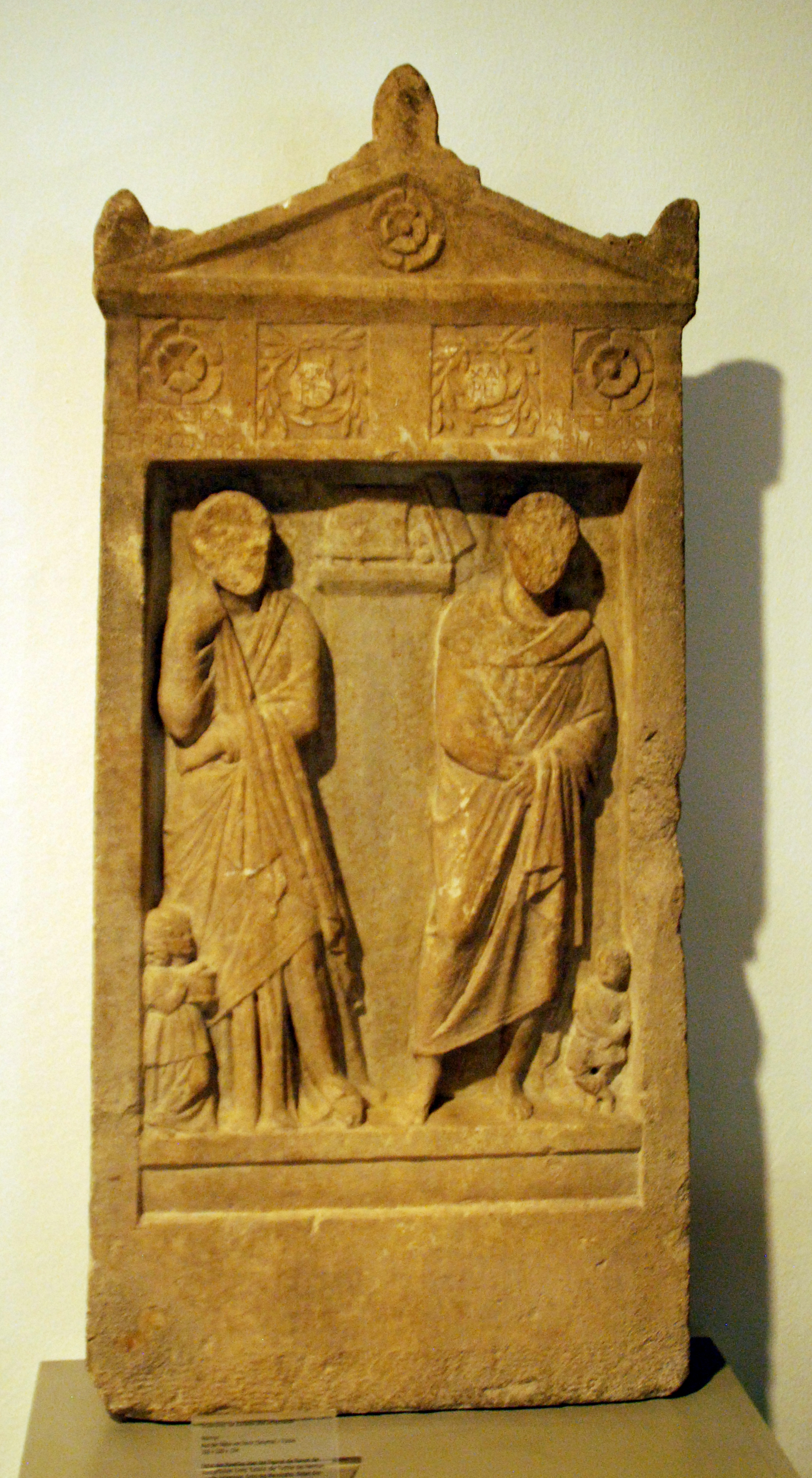
Grave relief for Eutaxia and Artemisios in the Museum August Kestner.

The Grave relief for Eutaxia and Artemisios is a Hellenistic grave relief in the antique collection of the Museum August Kestner in Hanover.

The relief is one of two Greek marble grave reliefs of the Museum August Kestner (Inventory number I 45). It is dated from the second half of the second century BC and is some two hundred years younger than the other piece made in Attica. The grave relief comes from the area around Smyrna (modern İzmir) and was acquired through the mediation of Carl Humann. It originated in Hellenistic times in Ionia, where, unlike in Attica, such funerary luxury was not prohibited.

The two inhabitants of the grave are depicted on the relief and named in an inscription. Eutaxia stands at left, the daughter of Hermon, while her husband Artemisios, son of Menekrates is at right. The decoration of the relief is informed by common forms of representation. Eutaxia is depicted in her garments and leans against the left wall. She holds an arm in front of her stomach, in the other hand she supports her head. The left leg is exposed almost to knee height under the cloak. A little servant figure stands with a pyxis in her hand, on the left side between the wall and Eutaxia. The faces of both figures have been knocked off. Artemisios rests his weight on his left leg; his right leg is free and leans to the left. He has his hands crossed in front of his stomach. He is dressed in a thick cape and an even smaller servant figure stands at his feet on the right. Above the proper field, there is an architectural imitation of a Greek tomb building. The pediment is surrounded by a cornice. In the centre of the triangle, a rosette. A frieze is found underneath with two other rosettes on the outside and two laurel wreaths on the inside. On disks in the wreaths, the simple greeting ΧΑΙΡΕ (be well) is found. The inscription of their names is carved under the lateral rosettes. Acroteria cap the sides and peak of the gable.

== Bibliography ==
- Ernst Pfuhl, Hans Möbius: Die ostgriechischen Grabreliefs. Bd. 1, Zabern, Mainz 1977, S. 162 Nr. 532 Taf. 82.
- Hans-Georg Dettmer: „… den Sinn für das Schöne erwecken …“. Führer durch das Kestner-Museum Hannover. Kestner-Museum Hannover, Hanover 1998, ISBN 3-924029-28-8, S. 94.
