= Aineta aryballos =

Ancient Greek vase in the British Museum

- The Aineta aryballos displayed in the British Museum
- Material: Ceramic
- Size: 6.35 centimetres (2.50 in) (height)
- Writing: Ancient Greek (Corinthian alphabet)
- Created: Disputed; c. 625 – c. 570 BCE
- Discovered: c. 1852; Corinth, Greece (reported)
- Present location: British Museum, London
- Identification: 1865,1213.1

The Aineta aryballos is an ancient Greek aryballos (a small, spherical flask or vase), made between approximately 625 and 570 BCE in the city of Corinth in southern Greece. Approximately 6.35 centimetres (2.50 in) in both height and diameter, it was intended to contain perfumed oil or unguent, and is likely to have been owned by a high-class courtesan (hetaira) by the name of Aineta, who may be portrayed in a drawing on its handle. The vase's illegal sale to the British Museum in 1865 led to the prosecution of its seller, the Athenian professor and art dealer Athanasios Rhousopoulos, and exposed his widespread involvement in antiquities crime.

The vase is inscribed with a portrait, generally agreed to be that of a woman and probably that of Aineta, who is named in the inscription on the vase. Below the portrait are the names of nine men, usually taken to be Aineta's admirers or lovers. The Aineta aryballos is likely to have been found in a grave, probably that of Aineta. According to Rhousopoulos, it was discovered in Corinth around 1852. In 1877, Panagiotis Efstratiadis, the Ephor General of Antiquities in charge of the Greek Archaeological Service, had Rhousopoulos fined for selling the vase in contravention of Greek law. Writing in 2012 for the Center for Hellenic Studies, Yannis Galanakis called the case "a milestone in the trafficking of Greek antiquities", in that it represented a relatively rare successful use of state power against the illegal trade in ancient Greek artefacts.

== Description ==
The Aineta aryballos is made from yellowish clay. It is a small vase, with a spherical body and a disc-shaped neck, connected by a handle. The entire aryballos is approximately 6.35 centimetres (2.50 in) in height and diameter. Its base is flat, allowing it to stand on its own. The opening of the jar is approximately 8 millimetres (0.31 in) in diameter, within a mouth approximately 4.2–4.8 centimetres (1.7–1.9 in) in diameter. The handle is 3.0 centimetres (1.2 in) wide and 2.5 centimetres (0.98 in) tall, and tapers slightly towards the bottom. The vase itself was made on a potter's wheel in two pieces – the globular body and the disc-shaped neck – which were subsequently joined to each other and to the handle.

The Athenian art dealer Athanasios Rhousopoulos, a professor at the University of Athens, made the first scholarly publication of the aryballos in 1862, in which he described it as "rather rough, but diligently cleaned". In his initial publication, Rhousopoulos said that it resembled a quince; later, he would describe it as "the size of an apple".

Aryballoi were small, spherical flasks or vases, typically used to store small amounts of perfumed oil or unguent. Rhousopoulos believed that the vase may have been a gift from her lovers to a high-class courtesan (hetaira) named Aineta, or perhaps deposited as a grave good in her tomb. (Note: Rhousopoulos attributed the latter idea to the German archaeologist Otto Jahn.) In support of this latter hypothesis, Rhousopoulos suggested that the vase's excellent state of preservation, as well as the lack of any post-manufacture inscriptions (such as the kalos inscription common on Attic vases) indicated that it had never been used. Matthias Steinhart and Eckhard Wirbelauer wrote in 2000 that it is universally considered to have been a gift of some nature; Rudolf Wachter concurred in 2001 with Rhousopoulos's assessment that the vase was probably a "love-gift".

== Decoration and date ==
The body and mouth of the vase are decorated with rosettes. Rhousopoulos considered the mouth, with its flower-like motif centred on the opening, as the finest part of the vase, writing "here we trace a fully Greek taste". He contrasted this with the decoration of the vase body, where, he judged, "we immediately find ourselves in unknown regions of Asia: magnificent, ... but strange and exotic". (Note: Rhousopoulos 1862, p. 47: Qui rintracciamo un gusto pienamente greco, ma, fatto un piccolo salto dal disco sul corpo del vaso, subito ci ritroviamo in regioni ignote dell' Asia, magnifiche sì, ma strane ed esotiche.) (Note: Fritz Lorber, in 1979, described the entire vase as being "of not overly high quality".)

The vase was made in the city of Corinth, in southern Greece. On the basis of its decoration, Rhousopoulos dated the vase to the 30th Olympiad (660–656 BCE), which would have made the Aineta aryballos the oldest-known inscribed Corinthian vase, and place it in the ceramic period known as Middle Protocorinthian II. (Note: Hasaki 2021, p. 78 (table 3.4), based on Amyx 1988, pp. 399, 428.) Its date has since been disputed: in his 1931 work on Corinthian pottery, Humfry Payne dated it to approximately 625 BCE on the basis of the letter-forms used in the inscription, an assessment endorsed by Lilian Hamilton Jeffery in 1961. (Note: Jeffery 1961, pp. 125, 131, cited in Wachter 2001, p. 47.) In 1979, Fritz Lorber argued that Payne's date was too early: he discussed the vase among those of the Early Corinthian period (620/615–595/590 BCE), (Note: Lorber 1979, pp. 28–30, cited in Wachter 2001, p. 48; for the date, Hasaki 2021, p. 78 (table 3.4), based on Amyx 1988, pp. 399, 428.) and wrote that the letter-forms show features, such as the serpentine form of the letter iota, characteristic of sixth-century inscriptions. Darrell A. Amyx suggested in 1988 that it most likely dates to the Middle Corinthian period (595/590–570 BCE), a view upheld by Wachter.

=== Inscription ===
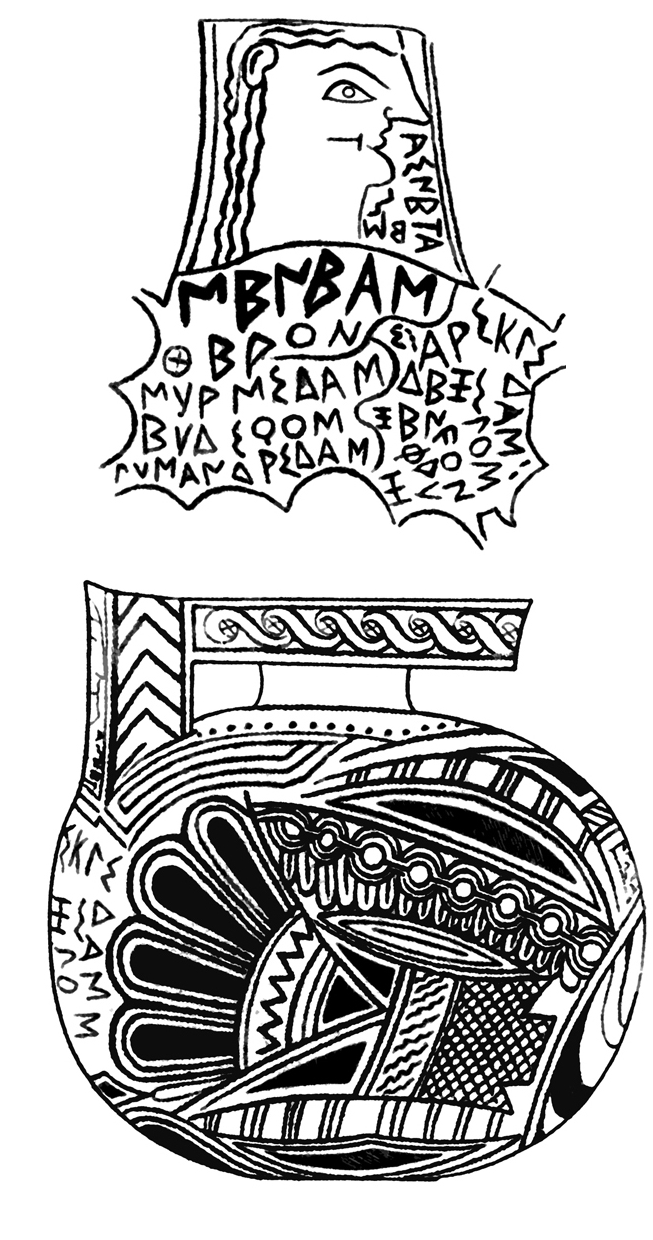
Line drawing of the aryballos, showing the decoration and inscription

The handle of the vase is inscribed with a drawing of the head of a woman, with a list of nine men's names on the vase body below it, (Note: Their names are Meneas (or Menneas), Theron, Myrmidas, Eudikos, Lysandridas, Kariklidas, Dexilos, Xenwon and Phryx.) separated from each other and the portrait by three dividing lines. Similar female portraits are common on other Corinthian vases of the type. All of the names, as well as the drawing, were inscribed at the time of the vase's manufacture. The writing uses the Corinthian alphabet.

Descending from the mouth of the woman's portrait is an inscription, Aineta emi (Αἰνέτα ἐμί): the word emi (Note: In Attic Greek, written as εἰμί (eimi); the ἐμί spelling is attested on other Corinthian vases.) means "I am", and Aineta is a name, meaning "the famous one" or "the praised one". It is generally considered to be a woman's name, (Note: Matthias Steinhart and Eckhard Wirbelauer consider that Aineta could be either a male or female name, but consider it most likely to be the name of the female figure portrayed if in the nominative form. On the probable gender of Aineta, see also Guarducci 1978, p. 400, who considers it most likely to be a woman's name, given its context in the inscription and parallels with similar texts.) probably of a hetaira, as it fits the common tendency for hetairai to have self-descriptive "speaking names". Scholars debate whether Aineta is in the nominative or the genitive case: if the former, the inscription translates as "I am Aineta"; if the latter, it means "I am Aineta's". In support of the nominative reading, Wachter and Margherita Guarducci point out that the words are written descending from the portrait's mouth, as if representing the portrait's speech. This is the earliest known example in Greek pottery of a speech-inscription; they became reasonably common in the sixth century BCE.

In 1976, Carlo Gallavotti argued that the portrait was that of a man's head, that the name was that of Ainetas, a male dancer, and that the other names were members of his troupe, including a musician named Menneas. (Note: Gallavotti 1976, p. 222; cited in Wachter 2001, p.48, n. 181.) This view has generally been rejected. Payne had earlier dismissed the "Ainetas" hypothesis on the grounds that the name is otherwise unknown in Greek. Aineta is sometimes considered to be a pseudonym or the name of a fictional hetaira, though Wachter considers it most likely to be real. The name Meneas (or Menneas) comes first in the list and is written slightly larger and more boldly than the others, and so seems to have been given particular prominence.

Rhousopoulos interpreted the female face as a drawing of the goddess Aphrodite. Most subsequent assessments have considered it more likely to be a portrait of Aineta. Katerina Volioti and Maria Papageorgiou have associated the portrait with similar depictions connected to the coming of age of upper-class women. In a 1942 article, Majorie Milne considered that the presence of multiple male names showed a "co-operative spirit" between Aineta's admirers, and contrasted the vase with a pyxis showing three female names that she suggested were those of hetairai. Wachter has described the list of names on the Aineta aryballos as good evidence for Corinthian prosopography and onomastics at the time of the vase's use.

== Discovery ==
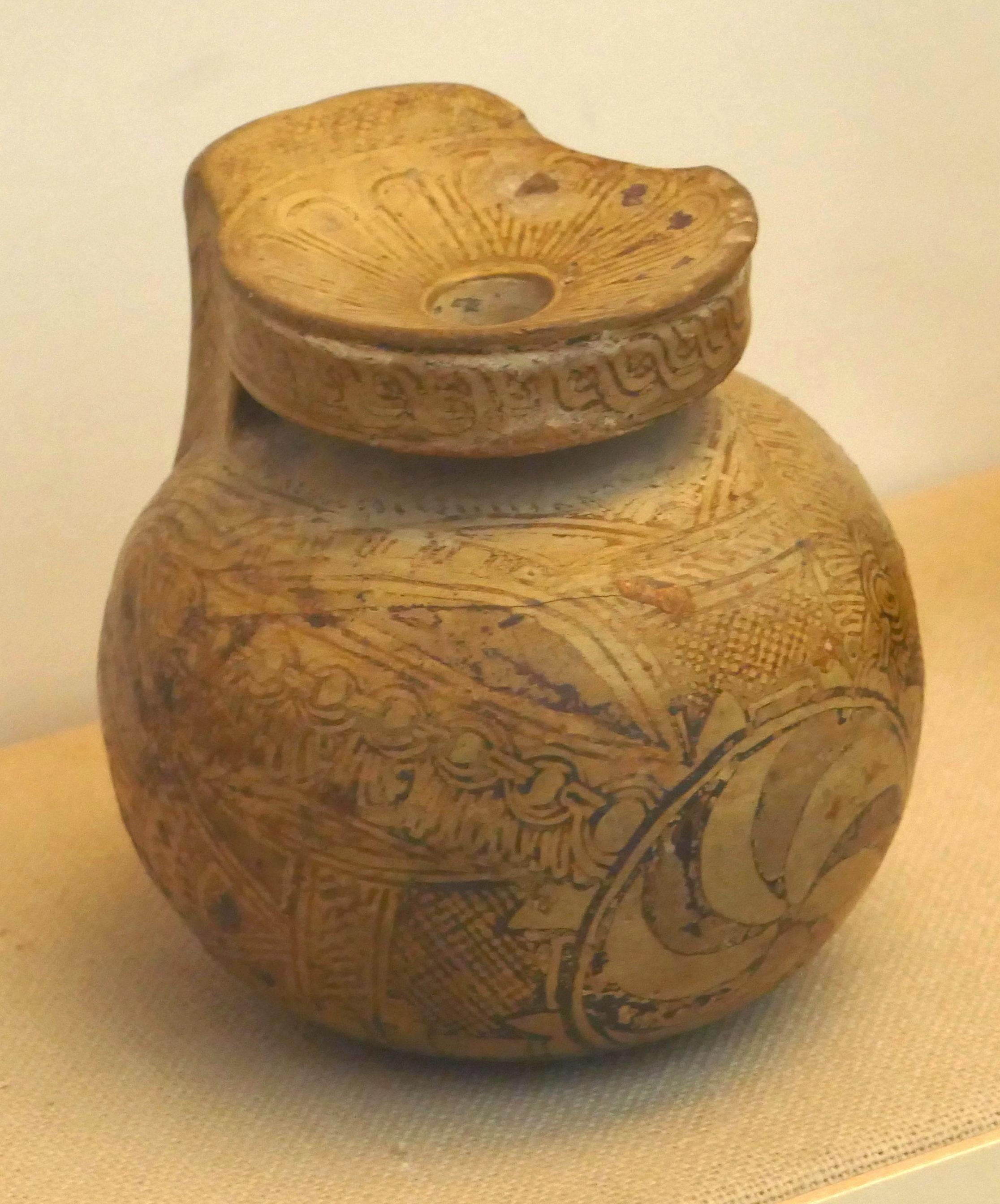
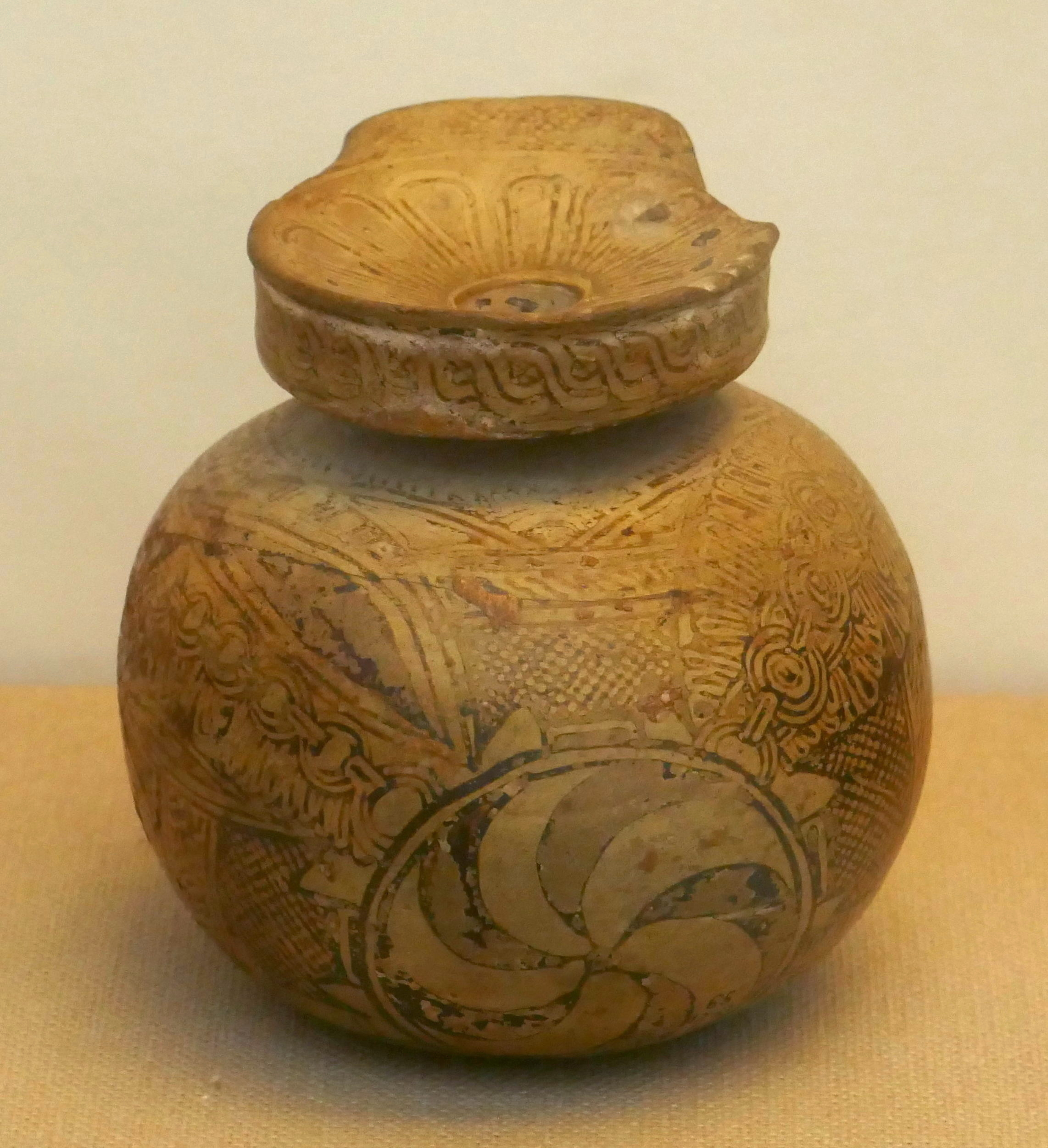
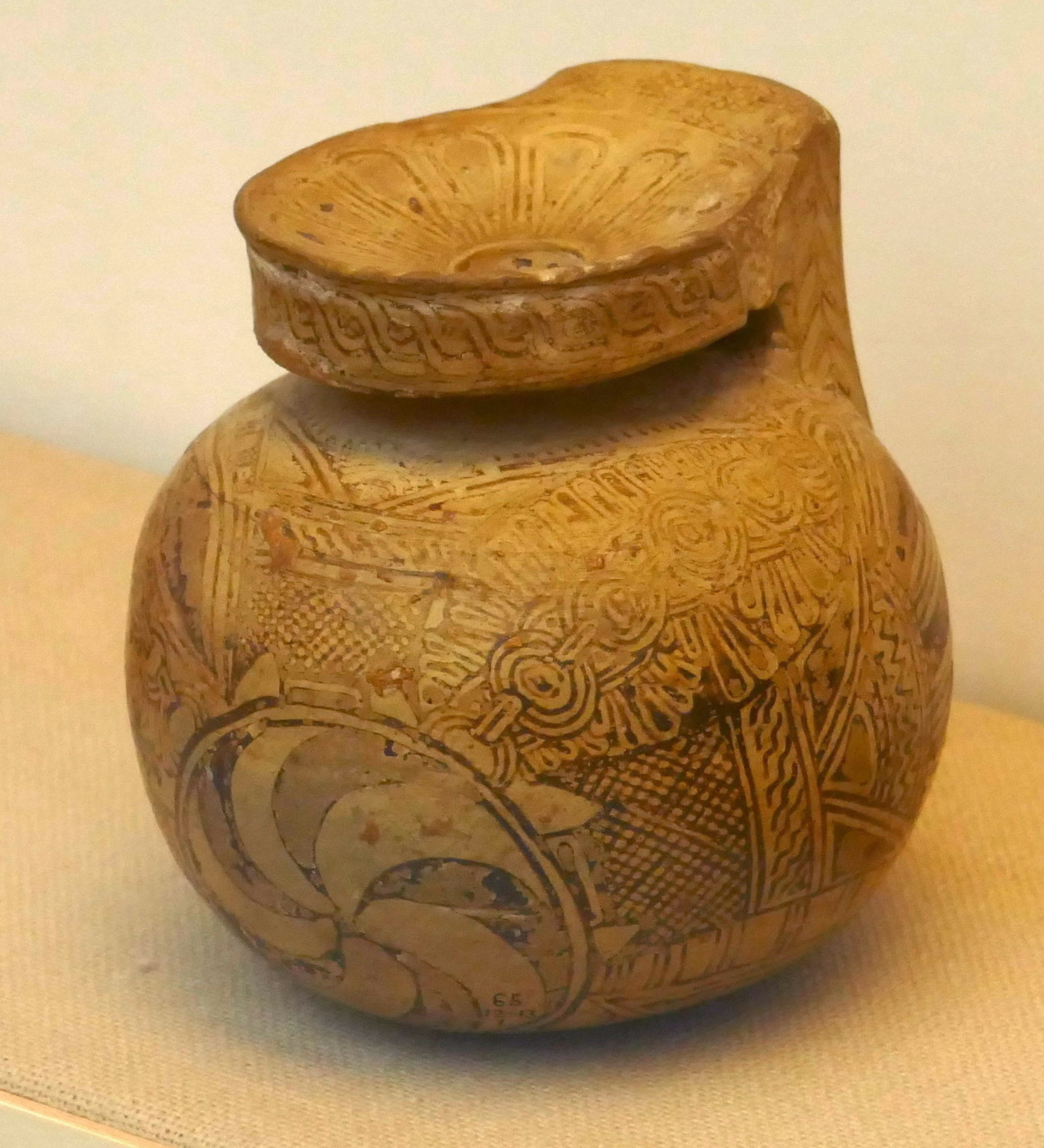
The aryballos viewed from the front

The vase was first mentioned in scholarship by Rhousopoulos, in an 1862 article in the journal of the German Archaeological Institute at Rome. (Note: The article is Rhousopoulos 1862.) According to Rhousopoulos's publication, the vase had been discovered around 1852 in Corinth, and had "come into [his] possession" a few years later.

Rhousopoulos was a part of the illegal trade in ancient artefacts excavated surreptitiously and without official permission. In the early 1870s, he boasted to the Oxford professor George Rolleston that he was able to call upon "all the Athens grave-diggers (Note: In Greek, tymborychoi (τυμβωρύχοι). Yannis Galanakis and Stella Skaltsa state that this word literally means grave-diggers, but that it had carried negative connotations of robbery since antiquity and, by the 1870s, "clearly referred to people who dig up tombs in order to despoil them". However, Galanakis and Nowak-Kemp elsewhere note that the term could also be used more neutrally, since tymborychoi often worked on legal excavations with the permission of the Ephor General.) who dig for tombs throughout Attica". Though his activities had not yet attracted official notice, Nikolaos Papazarkadas has written that Rhousopoulos "was heavily involved in dubious transactions involving illegally excavated antiquities". The main law governing antiquities was the Archaeological Law of 22 May [O.S. 10 May] 1834, (Note: Greece adopted the Gregorian calendar in 1923; 28 February [O.S. 15 February] was followed by 1 March.) which Galanakis has characterised as "loosely interpreted and even more loosely enforced". Under the 1834 law, private excavators – often referred to as "grave-robbers" – required the permission of the Ephor General to excavate, but the Ephor General was obliged to grant that authorisation if the excavation took place on private land and had the landowner's consent. Furthermore, antiquities discovered in such excavations were considered the joint property of the state and the private excavators, and would be shared between the landowners and the excavators. Such artefacts could be sold freely overseas, provided that their owners secured the judgement of a state committee of three experts that the object was "useless" to Greek museums.

== Sale to the British Museum ==
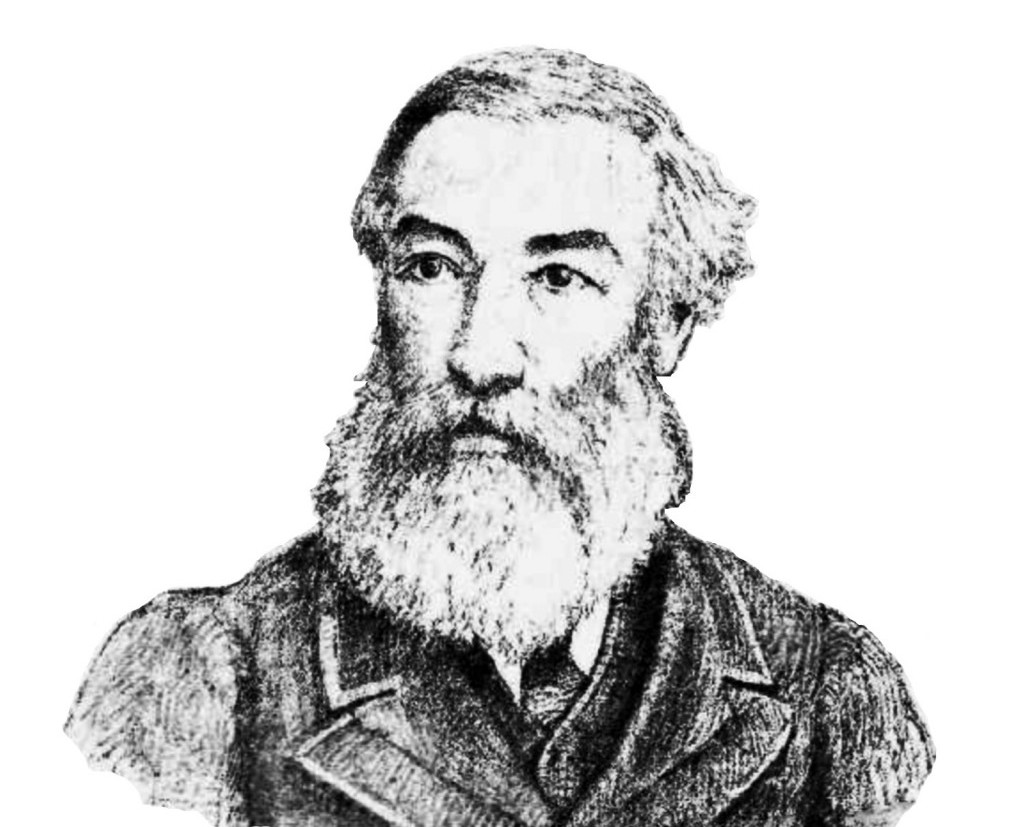
Charles Merlin, who purchased the aryballos from Rhousopoulos on behalf of the British Museum

In 1865, Panagiotis Efstratiadis, the Ephor General in charge of the Greek Archaeological Service, (Note: Efstratiadis had been appointed to the office in 1864, following the death of Kyriakos Pittakis.) wrote in his diary of the size and richness of Rhousopoulos's antiquities collection, marking the first time that Rhousopoulos's activities had come to official attention. Rhousopoulos sold the aryballos to the British Museum for 1,000 drachmae in 1865, (Note: By way of comparison, Rhousopoulos earned 350 drachmae a month from his professorship at Athens in 1859.) via Charles Merlin, a British banker and diplomat resident in Athens who often acted as an intermediary for antiquities purchases. Charles Newton, the museum's Keeper of Greek and Roman Antiquities, had previously selected the object for purchase, and subsequently received it from Merlin. Rhousopoulos made the sale without securing the required permission from the state committee, but defended himself in the newspaper Elpis on 16 February [O.S. 4 February] 1867, arguing that the aryballos was "of no artistic value, the size of an apple, only valued for 25 drachmae". Efstratiadis, meanwhile, denounced Rhousopoulos as a "university professor; antiquities looter".

Efstratiadis's ability to respond to Rhousopoulos's breach of the law was limited: the state had few financial, human or legal resources to address the illegal excavation and trade of antiquities, and his superiors in government had little political will to do so. He also needed to maintain good relations with Athens's art dealers, who undertook more excavations in this period than either the Greek Archaeological Service or the closely aligned Archaeological Society of Athens, and usually offered to sell the artefacts they uncovered to the state. Furthermore, Rhousopoulos was periodically a member of the appraising committee of three, and often acted as a consultant to it, further limiting Efstratiadis's ability to use the state's archaeological apparatus against him.

Rhousopoulos was fined 1,000 drachmae (the same amount for which he had sold the aryballos) later in 1867 for exporting antiquities without the Ephor General's permission. His actions were condemned by the Minister for Education and Religious Affairs, who oversaw the Archaeological Service, and by the Archaeological Society of Athens, which expelled him at some point in the 1870s. Rhousopoulos subsequently endeavoured to keep his antiquities dealing outside the knowledge and scrutiny of the state. Writing for the Center for Hellenic Studies in 2012, Galanakis called the case over the aryballos "a milestone in the trafficking of Greek antiquities", in that it represented a rare successful prosecution for the unauthorised export of an ancient artefact under the 1834 law.

== Bibliography ==
- Amyx, Darell Arlynn (1988). Corinthian Vase-Painting of the Archaic Period: II: Commentary: The Study of Corinthian Vases. California Studies in the History of Art. Berkeley, Los Angeles and London: University of California Press. ISBN 978-0-520-03166-1.
- British Museum (28 April 2020). "Aryballos". The British Museum. Archived from the original on 5 February 2023.
- Cohen, Beth (2006). The Colors of Clay: Special Techniques in Athenian Vase Painting. Los Angeles: J. Paul Getty Trust. ISBN 978-0-89236-942-3.
- Galanakis, Yannis; Nowak-Kemp, Malgosia (2013). "Ancient Greek Skulls in the Oxford University Museum, Part II: The Rhousopoulos–Rolleston Correspondence". Journal of the History of Collections. 25 (1): 1–17. doi:10.1093/jhc/fhq040. ISSN 1477-8564.
- Galanakis, Yannis; Skaltsa, Stella (2012). "Tomb Robbers, Art Dealers, and a Dikast's Pinakion from an Athenian Grave". Hesperia. 81 (4): 619–653. doi:10.2972/hesperia.81.4.0619. ISSN 0018-098X. JSTOR 10.2972/hesperia.81.4.0619. S2CID 163987166.
- Galanakis, Yannis (2008). "Doing Business: Two Unpublished Letters from Athanasios Rhousopoulos to Arthur Evans in the Ashmolean Museum, Oxford". In Kurtz, Donna; Meyer, Caspar; Saunders, David; Tsingarida; Athena; Harris, Nicole (eds.). Essays in Classical Archaeology for Eleni Hatzivassiliou 1977–2007. Oxford: British Archaeological Reports. pp. 297–309. ISBN 978-1-4073-0284-3.
- Galanakis, Yannis (2011). "An Unpublished Stirrup Jar from Athens and the 1871–2 Private Excavations in the Outer Kerameikos". Annual of the British School at Athens. 106: 167–200. doi:10.1017/S0068245411000074. ISSN 0068-2454. JSTOR 41721707. S2CID 162544324.
- Galanakis, Yannis (17 October 2012). "Guns, Drugs, and the Trafficking of Antiquities: Archaeology in 19th-century Greece". Center for Hellenic Studies Research Bulletin. Harvard University. Archived from the original on 31 March 2023.
- Galanakis, Yannis (31 October 2012). ""University Professor – Antiquities Looter"?". Center for Hellenic Studies Research Bulletin. Harvard University. Archived from the original on 31 March 2023.
- Galanakis, Yannis (15 November 2012). "Of Grave Hunters & Earth Contractors: A Look at the "Private Archaeology" of Greece". Center for Hellenic Studies Research Bulletin. Harvard University. Archived from the original on 31 March 2023.
- Galanakis, Yannis (30 November 2012). "On Her Majesty's Service: C. L. W. Merlin and the Sourcing of Greek Antiquities for the British Museum". Center for Hellenic Studies Research Bulletin. Harvard University. Archived from the original on 4 February 2023.
- Galanakis, Yannis (31 December 2012). "'Insignificant', 'Superfluous' and 'Useless': Legal Antiquities for Export?". Center for Hellenic Studies Research Bulletin. Harvard University. Archived from the original on 26 January 2023.
- Gallavotti, Carlo (1976). "Il balletto di Purrias" [The Ballet of Purrias]. Rendiconti della Classe di Scienze Morali, Storiche e Filologiche dell'Accademia dei Lincei (in Italian). 31: 219–222. ISSN 0391-8181.
- Gerleigner, Georg Simon (2016). "Chapter Nine: Tracing Letters on the Eurymedon Vase: On the Importance of Placement of Vase-Inscriptions". In Yatromanolakis, Dimitrios (ed.). Epigraphy of Art: Ancient Greek Vase-Inscriptions and Vase-Paintings. Oxford: Archaeopress. pp. 165–184. ISBN 978-1-78491-486-8.
- Guarducci, Margherita (1978). "Ancora di epigrafi greche arcaiche: III" [More Ancient Greek Inscriptions: III]. Rendiconti della Classe di Scienze Morali, Storiche e Filologiche dell'Accademia dei Lincei (in Italian). 33: 397–402. ISSN 0391-8181.
- Hasaki, Eleni (2021). Potters at Work in Ancient Corinth: Industry, Religion and the Penteskouphia Pinakes. Princeton: American School of Classical Studies at Athens. ISBN 978-0-87661-553-9.
- Hurwit, Jeffrey M. (2015). Artists and Signatures in Ancient Greece. Cambridge University Press. doi:10.1017/CBO9781316226452. ISBN 978-1-316-22645-2.
- Jeffery, Lilian Hamilton (1961). The Local Scripts of Archaic Greece. Oxford University Press. ISBN 978-0-19-814061-0.
- Kiminas, Dimitrios (2009). The Ecumenical Patriarchate. San Bernardino: The Borgo Press. ISBN 978-1-4344-5876-6.
- Klinger, Sonia (2009). "Women and Deer: From Athens to Corinth and Back". In Oakley, John H.; Palagia, Olga (eds.). Athenian Potters and Painters. Vol. 2. Oxford: Oxbow Books. pp. 100–107. ISBN 978-1-84217-350-3.
- Lorber, Fritz (1979). Inschriften auf korinthischen Vasen [Inscriptions on Corinthian Vases] (in German). Berlin: Deutsches Archaologisches Institut. ISBN 978-3-7861-1180-1 – via Internet Archive.
- Milne, Marjorie (1942). "Three Names on a Corinthian Jar". American Journal of Archaeology. 46 (2): 217–222. doi:10.2307/499384. ISSN 0002-9114. JSTOR 499384. S2CID 191354944.
- Papazarkadas, Nikolaos (2014). "Epigraphy in Early Modern Greece". Journal of the History of Collections. 26 (3): 399–412. doi:10.1093/jhc/fhu018. ISSN 1477-8564.
- Payne, Humfry (1931). Neocorinthia: A Study of Corinthian Art in the Archaic Period. Oxford University Press. OCLC 2800964.
- Petrakos, Vasileios (2011). Η εν Αθήναις Αρχαιολογική Εταιρεία. Οι Αρχαιολόγοι και οι Ανασκαφές 1837–2011 (Κατάλογος Εκθέσεως) [The Archaeological Society of Athens. The Archaeologists and the Excavations 1837–2011] (in Greek). Archaeological Society of Athens. ISBN 978-960-8145-86-3.
- Rhousopoulos, Athanasios Sergiou (1862). "Sopra un vasetto corinzio con iscrizioni d'un carattere antichissimo" [On a Small Corinthian Vase with Inscriptions of a Most Ancient Character]. Annali dell'Instituto di Corrispondenza Archeologica (in Italian). 34: 46–56. ISSN 0394-3798.
- Steinhart, Matthias; Wirbelauer, Eckhard (2000). "Par Peisistratou: Epigraphische Zeugnisse zur Geschichte des Schenkens" [Par Peisistratou: Epigraphic Evidence on the History of Gift-Giving]. Chiron (in German). 30: 255–289. ISSN 0069-3715.
- Volioti, Katerina; Papageorgiou, Maria (2015). "A New Signed Corinthian Aryballos". Talanta – Proceedings of the Dutch Archaeological and Historical Society. 46–47: 107–120. ISSN 0165-2486.
- Wachter, Rudolf (2001). Non-Attic Greek Vase Inscriptions. Oxford University Press. ISBN 978-0-19-814093-1.
- Williams, Dyfri (1999). Greek Vases. London: British Museum Press. ISBN 0-7141-2138-X.
