= Ernst Buschor =

German archaeologist and translator (1886-1961)

Ernst Buschor (2 June 1886, Hürben – 11 December 1961, Munich) was a German archaeologist and translator.

== Biography ==
From 1905, Buschor studied at the Ludwig-Maximilians-Universität München as a student of classical archaeologist Adolf Furtwängler, earning his doctorate in 1912. After serving as a soldier in the Balkans during World War I, he became an associate professor of classical archaeology at the University of Erlangen. In 1920, he became a full professor at the University of Freiburg. From 1921 to 1929, he was director of the German Archaeological Institute at Athens. From 1929 to 1959, he served as a professor of classical archaeology at the Ludwig-Maximilians-Universität München.

From 1922 to 1924, he conducted archaeological excavations in Athens, Olympia and Amyklai (Sparta), and for many years served as director of excavations on the island of Samos (1925–1939; 1951–1961). In 1921, he became a full member of the Bavarian Academy of Sciences.

== Selected works ==
Buschor is credited for providing translations of all 31 extant tragedies of Aeschylus, Sophocles and Euripides. The following are a few of his significant writings:

- Griechische Vasenmalerei (= Klassische Illustratoren 5, ZDB-ID 514662-8). Piper, Munich 1913. Translated into English as: Greek vase-painting; London, Chatto & Windus [1921].
- Beiträge zur Geschichte der griechischen Textilkunst. Die Anfänge und der orientalische Import. Kastner & Callwey, München 1912 (Ludwig-Maximilians-Universität München, phil. Dissertation, 26 January 1912) – Contributions to the history of Greek textile art.
- Euripides: Orestes. Iphigenie in Aulis. Die Maenaden. 3 Tragoedien. Beck, Munich 1960 – Euripides: Orestes. Iphigénie in Aulis. The Maenads; 3 tragedies.
- Winke für Akropolispilger. Beck, Munich 1960 – Hints for Acropolis pilgrims.
- Gesamtausgabe der griechischen Tragödien. 10 Bände. Artemis Verlag, Zurich i. a. 1979, ISBN 3-7608-3657-7 – Edition of the Greek tragedies. Translated by Ernst Buschor. 10 volumes.
- Vom Sinn der griechischen Standbilder, Translated into English as: On the meaning of Greek statues; Amherst : University of Massachusetts Press, 1980.

== Bibliography ==
- Karl Schefold: Ernst Buschor 1886–1961. In: Archäologenbildnisse. Porträts und Kurzbiographien von Klassischen Archäologen deutscher Sprache. von Zabern, Mainz 1988, ISBN 3-8053-0971-6, S. 234–235.
