= Paul Jacobsthal =

German archaeologist

- Born: 23 February 1880; Berlin, Germany
- Died: 27 October 1957 (aged 77); Oxford, England
- Education: University of Bonn
- Occupation: Academic
- Known for: Study of Greek vase painting and Celtic art

Paul Jacobsthal (23 February 1880 in Berlin – 27 October 1957 in Oxford) was a scholar of Greek vase painting and Celtic art. He wrote his dissertation at the University of Bonn under the supervision of Georg Loeschcke. In 1912 he published a catalog of the Greek vases in Göttingen, and received a position as a professor at the University of Marburg.

In the 1920s Jacobsthal became interested in the work of John Beazley on vase painting, and began to adopt Beazley's taxonomical methodologies. His 1927 work, Ornamente griechischer Vasen, was dedicated to Beazley. In 1930 Jacobsthal and Beazley began to collaborate on an inventory of early Greek vases, the Bilder griechischer Vasen, a project which they concluded in 1939. After World War II, the two scholars served as co-editors of the Oxford Classical Monographs.

In 1935 Jacobsthal was forced to leave Nazi Germany on account of his Jewish heritage – though he was baptised a protestant, both of his parents were Jewish. He settled in England, and in 1937 was appointed as a lecturer at Christ Church, Oxford. There he continued his collaboration with Beazley.

Soon after his arrival in England, Jacobsthal began to study the art of the Celts, and in 1944 published his study of Early Celtic Art. This book focused on the impact of Greek ornament on Celtic decorative arts, and was one of the earliest English-language works to employ the terminology established by Alois Riegl in his Stilfragen. From 1947 through 1950 Jacobsthal served as University Reader in Celtic Archaeology at Oxford University.

Jacobsthal's final study, Greek pins and their connexions with Europe and Asia (1956), returned to the cataloguing of material from Greek antiquity, while remaining engaged with issues of the reception of Greek art abroad.

Jacobsthal's students included the Swiss archaeologist Karl Schefold and Hans Möbius.

== Sources ==
- Martyn Jope, Paul Ferdinand Jacobsthal. Proceedings of the Seventh International Congress of Celtic Studies: Oxford, 1983. Ed E Ellis Evans et al., Jesus College, Oxford/Oxbow Books, 1986 15–18.
- Martin Robertson, "Dr. P.F. Jacobsthal", The Burlington Magazine 100 (1958), 27.
