= Charles Merlin =

British diplomat and antiquities trader (1821–1896)

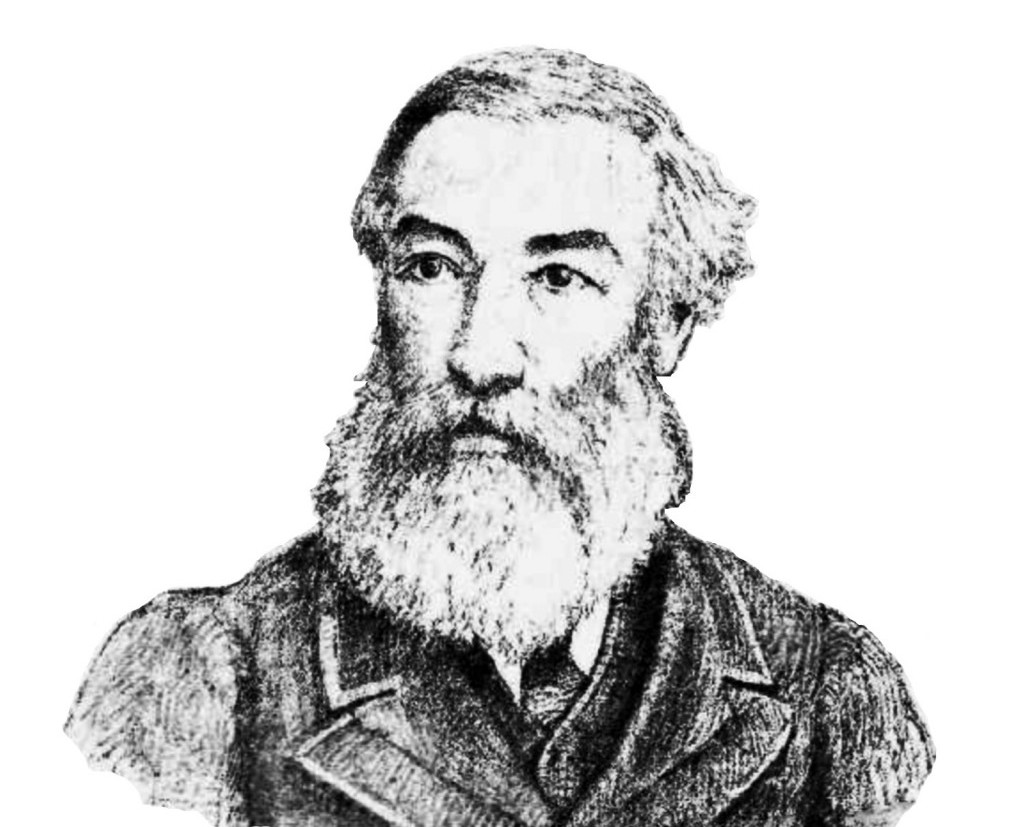
- Portrait of Merlin from the Greek newspaper To Asty, 1887
- Born: Charles Louis William Merlin; 1821
- Died: 23 August 1896 (aged 75); Campden Hill, London
- Occupations: Diplomat, banker, antiquities trader
- Known for: Procurement of antiquities for the British Museum
- Spouse: Isabella Dorothea Green
- Children: 6, of whom 3 survived to adulthood, including Sidney

Signature
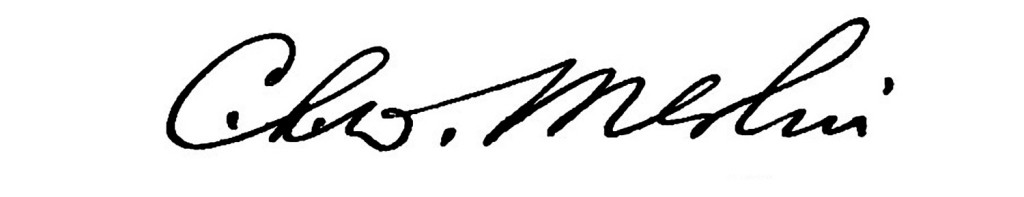

Charles Louis William Merlin (1821 – 23 August 1896) was a British banker, diplomat and antiquities trader. He is known for his role in procuring objects, particularly Graeco-Roman antiquities, for the British Museum.

Born to a family of French aristocrats settled in London, Merlin joined the British consular service in Piraeus, the port of Athens, in 1836. He remained stationed in Greece for the next five decades, where he also worked for the British-owned Ionian Bank and rose to the rank of consul-general in 1886. From the early 1860s until his return to Britain in 1887, he corresponded closely with Charles Newton, the British Museum's Keeper of Greek and Roman Antiquities, who used Merlin as an intermediary to circumvent Greek laws against the export of ancient artefacts.

Merlin's sales to the British Museum totalled around 460 objects. These included the Aineta aryballos, whose export in 1864 launched a minor scandal in Greece, and casts of some of the Parthenon marbles still remaining in situ. He has been termed "among the most prolific, if not the most important, direct providers of antiquities" to the British Museum in the nineteenth century.

== Early life ==
Charles Louis William Merlin was born in 1821 to French parents, François-Nicolas and Augusta Merlin. François-Nicolas was a relative of the aristocrat Philippe-Antoine Merlin de Douai, a prominent supporter of the French Revolution. The Merlin family moved to London at some point after the revolution; the archaeological historian Yannis Galanakis has suggested that the Merlin family may have emigrated to England following the restoration of the Bourbon monarchy in 1814. (Note: Galanakis 2012b. An 1887 profile of Merlin in the Greek newspaper To Asty stated that his family had emigrated "during the turbulent times of the French Revolution".) Charles Merlin may have studied at Dulwich College, a public school in South London. (Note: Galanakis 2012b, conjecturing "Dulwich" as a correction for "Dill" written in Merlin's 1887 To Asty profile.)

== Career ==
In 1839, Merlin took a job as a clerk and administrator for the British consulate based in the Piraeus district of Athens. Galanakis has attributed Merlin's recruitment to his bilingualism in French and English, as well as his good penmanship and willingness to advocate for British interest. Britain maintained an envoy extraordinary at Athens for diplomatic functions, making the role of the Piraeus consulate, in Merlin's own words, "strictly a commercial one". (Note: Galanakis 2012b, quoting a report made by Merlin to the House of Commons in 1872.) Merlin spent most of his life in Athens: the historians Lucia Patrizio Gunning and Despina Vlami describe him as a "Levantine", a term which referred to British consuls felt to have taken on local culture through long service in the Eastern Mediterranean.

In 1846, he was appointed as British Vice-Consul at the Piraeus, an unpaid position. In the same year, he became an agent for the Ionian Bank, a British overseas bank based in the Ionian islands which was largely responsible for funding, through loans, the islands' public finances throughout the 1840s and 1850s. (Note: From 1815 until 1864, the Ionian Islands were a protectorate of the United Kingdom. For the bank's involvement with the Ionian government, see Gekas 2013, pp. 64–65.) He was a partner in the merchant house run by John Green, a relative of Merlin's father-in-law, in Patras. In 1865, he became the manager of the Ionian Bank's branch in Athens, and in 1868 was promoted to be Britain's consul in Piraeus, having previously filled the role in an acting capacity during 1859 and 1864. This was his first diplomatic post which paid a salary; he was given £350 a year, plus £100 for expenses, of which £85 were spent on the wages of a clerk. By comparison with other British consuls in the Aegean, this was a relatively low salary – higher only than that paid to the consul at Missolonghi, who earned £200 per annum, and far less than the consul at Constantinople, who earned £1,600 – reflecting the comparatively minor responsibilities of the post. On his promotion, he was forbidden from engaging in business outside his work for the Ionian Bank, but the combined income of his consular post and position with the bank – which paid him around £600 per annum and additionally covered the rent, heating and lighting of his house – made him comfortably off in Athenian society. The consul's duties included commercial and bureaucratic responsibilities, as well as hearing complaints from and resolving disputes among British subjects and merchant sailors.

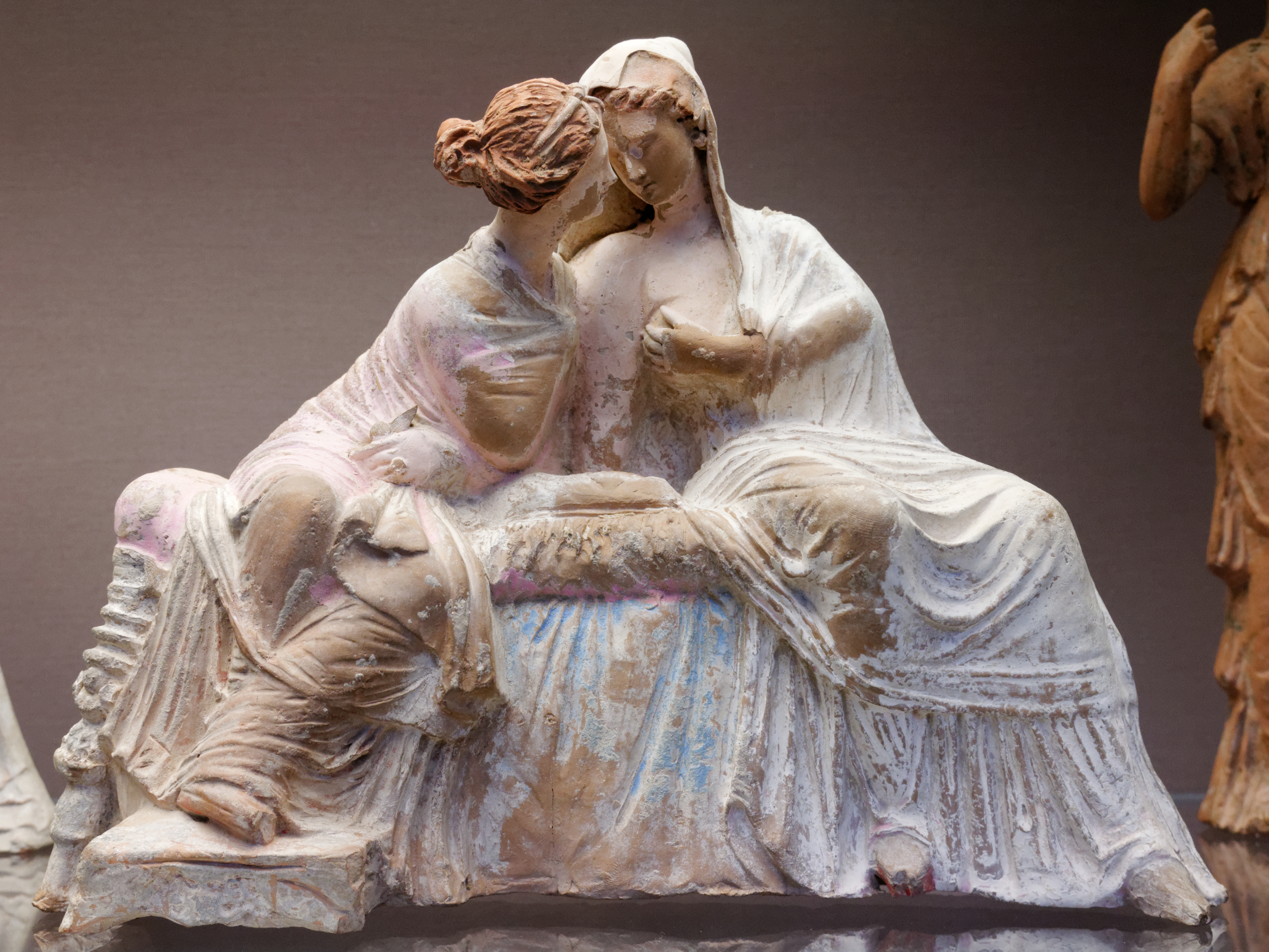
Terracotta statuette, reportedly from Myrina on Lemnos, made around 100 BCE and sold by Merlin to the British Museum in 1884

From the 1850s, Merlin took a greater role in diplomatic work, participating in commissions concerning the Epirus Revolt of 1854 and the Thessaly Revolt of 1878, both of which concerned insurrections by Greeks living within the Ottoman Empire, and in those investigating the murders of British citizens in Greece. (Note: Specifically, the 1856 killing of three members of the Leeves family in Euboea, and the 1882 death of Charles Chaloner Ogle, a correspondent for The Times, at Pelion during the revolt in Thessaly.) After King Otto was forced into exile by a popular uprising in 1862, he gained widespread respect for his assistance of many Greeks caught in the ensuing chaos, as well as for procuring credit from the Ionian Bank for the Greek government and protecting the Bank of Greece.

In 1887, Merlin retired from his consular duties and moved his family to Campden Hill in West London, where he was employed as the Ionian Bank's general manager. He retired from this post in 1891, but accepted a position on the bank's Court of Directors which earned him £200 per annum in addition to his pension of £400. He died on 23 August 1896, leaving what Galanakis terms "a good but relatively modest estate" of £3,695 9s; the bank voted to continue paying his pension to his wife until the end of 1896.

== Antiquities trading ==
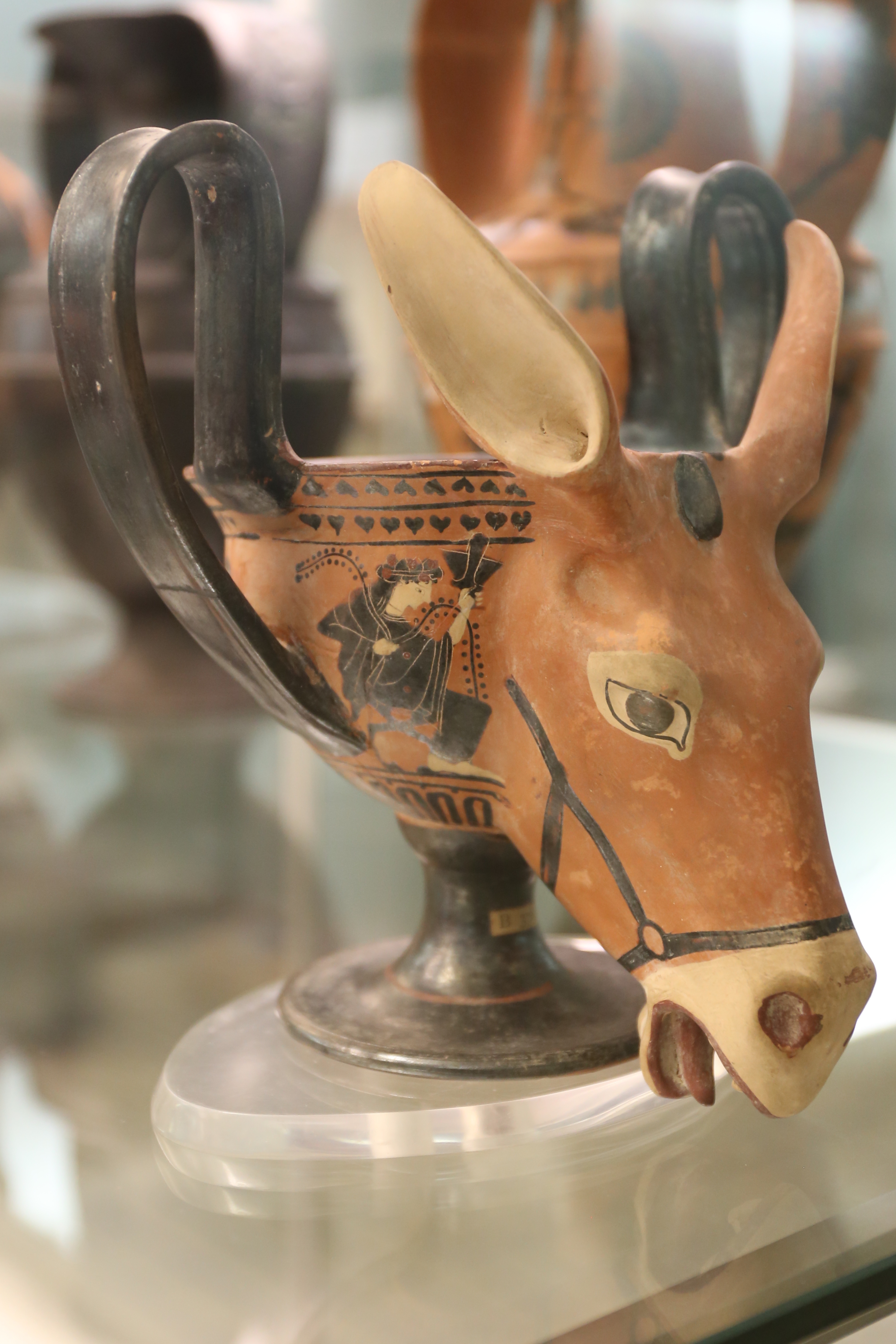
An Athenian kantharos (c. 520 – c. 500 BCE), sold by Merlin to the British Museum in 1876

Merlin has been termed a significant figure in the identification and trafficking of antiquities between Athens and London. He maintained a close professional relationship with Charles Newton, himself a former British consul in the eastern Mediterranean, who was appointed as the British Museum's Keeper of Greek and Roman Antiquities in 1861. Newton made heavy use of British consuls as conduits for the acquisition of antiquities, drawing up in 1863 a list of instructions for those working in the Aegean which became part of the Foreign Office's official instructions to its consuls. Gunning and Vlami have credited Merlin's career to Newton's support. While in Athens, Merlin maintained a regular correspondence with Newton by letter.

Merlin's relationship with Newton began in 1864, when Newton visited Athens and identified a number of antiquities, which Merlin agreed to purchase on his behalf. In 1865, he facilitated the sale of the Aineta aryballos to the museum, acting as intermediary between the Athens art dealer Athanasios Rhousopoulos and Newton, who had earlier selected the aryballos for purchase. The unauthorised export of antiquities was illegal in Greece, and Rhousopoulos was prosecuted by Panagiotis Efstratiadis, the head of the Greek Archaeological Service; he was expelled from the Archaeological Society of Athens, and fined in 1874 the 1,000 drachmas he had been paid for the vase. (Note: By way of comparison, Rhousopoulos earned 350 drachmas a month from his professorship at Athens in 1859.) The British minister at Athens, Edward Morris Erskine, warned Merlin that knowledge of his connection to the sale might "give [Merlin] some annoyance"; thereafter, Merlin generally attempted to conceal his identity when selling antiquities. (Note: Galanakis 2012b. Erskine's quotation comes from a letter sent to Merlin on 23 June 1867.)

Between 1865 and 1892, Merlin supplied around 460 objects to the British Museum, primarily Greek and Roman antiquities. He had earlier sent naturalistic specimens to the museum: in 1844, he presented it with twenty specimens of birds from Athens. He had little interest in antiquities, but saw partaking in their trade as a means of supplementing his income, as well as participating in an activity popular among British high society and exercising what the archaeologist Louise Willocx terms his "patriotic duty". He sold other objects privately on the London art market. His sales included, in 1872, the first examples of Aegean seal-stones to enter the museum's collection, sourced from Rhousopoulos and his rival Jean Lambros. Objects of this kind would later provide the first identified evidence of the writing systems known as Linear A and Linear B.

In 1872, Merlin procured for Newton casts of the West Frieze of the Parthenon, made by the Italian sculptor Napoleone Martinelli for a cost of £33. The West Frieze was the only full section of the frieze remaining in situ: casts of it had been made by Lord Elgin, who had removed most of the other sculptures from the temple, in the early nineteenth century. (Note: Payne 2019, p. 1628. For the payment of £33 to Martinelli, see Jenkins 1990, note 67.) By 1869, the moulds used by Elgin had become severely worn out through repeated use in making new copies, and likely disposed of by the museum. When Merlin's casts arrived in London in 1873, Newton found that they showed that the frieze's condition had deteriorated since Elgin's casts had been made, and had both sets of casts displayed side by side in a bid to demonstrate that the sculptures were safer kept in the British Museum than in Athens.

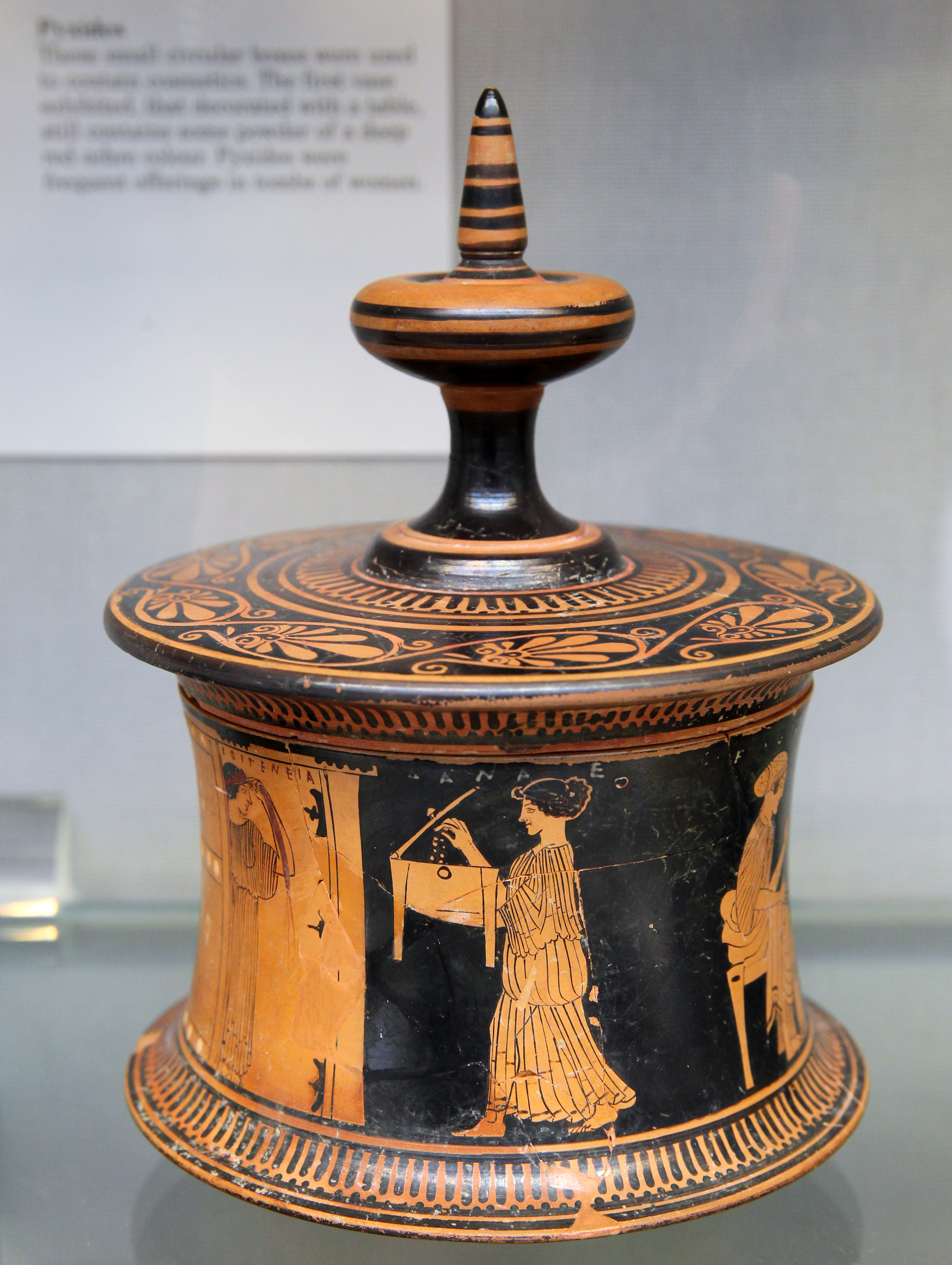
A red-figure pyxis (c. 500 – c. 470 BCE), attributed to "a follower of Douris", bought from Rhousopoulos and sold by Merlin to the British Museum in 1884

Merlin took a sceptical view of the work of Heinrich Schliemann, the German businessman and amateur archaeologist who claimed to have found the remains of Homeric Troy. Merlin, himself a friend of Schliemann's, wrote to Newton on 6 November 1872 expressing his doubts about Schliemann's claims, and describing Schliemann's obsession with Troy as "a bee in his bonnet". Following Schliemann's discovery of Grave Circle A at Mycenae in 1876, which Schliemann claimed to be the burial-place of the Homeric king Agamemnon, Merlin wrote to Newton that "Schliemann's geese are all swans", referring to his tendency to exaggerate and romanticise his finds. He also conveyed the low opinion in which Schliemann was held by Ernst Curtius, director of the German excavations at Olympia. (Note: Merlin further reported to Newton that "the Greeks swear [Schliemann] rogered his wife on the spot, in an ecstasy of antiquarian delight", when he discovered the alleged remains of Agamemnon.) Merlin was among the first visitors to Schliemann's exhibition of the finds from Mycenae, held at the National Bank of Athens in 1877; he reported to Newton afterwards that "whether they are of the very great antiquity Schliemann claims for them, I am not able to judge", and described Schliemann as "vulgar in his manners" and as "giv[ing] his opinions as if there is no-one who knows anything but himself". (Note: Baker 2020, pp. 36–37 (emphasis original: Merlin underlined these words.))

After Newton retired from the British Museum in 1885, Merlin maintained a correspondence with Alexander Stuart Murray, Newton's successor as Keeper of Greek and Roman Antiquities. Merlin was also a member from 1860 until 1880 of the Archaeological Society of Athens, a Greek learned society with a prominent role in archaeology and conservation, and donated a few objects to its museum. (Note: Gunning & Vlami 2023, p. 10. For the dates, see Galanakis 2012b.) Galanakis estimates that Merlin earned around £160 per year from his sales to the British Museum, which was broadly comparable with the amount he gained from selling antiquities privately, and that he was "among the most prolific, if not the most important, direct providers of antiquities" from Greece to the museum.

== Personal life ==
Merlin was fluent in English, French and Greek. On 31 August 1847, he married Isabella Dorothea Green at Christ Church, Marylebone, in London. Green's father, Philip James Green, had been the British consul at Patras during the Greek War of Independence. They had six children, of whom three – Charles, Sidney and Augustus – survived to adulthood. Sidney became a botanist and competed for Great Britain in shooting events at the 1896, 1900 and 1906 Olympic Games. Augustus Merlin became the British vice-consul at Volos in the 1880s and was promoted to consul in 1917, serving in the role until 1920.

== Notes and references ==
=== Bibliography ===
- Allen, Susan Heuck (1999). Finding the Walls of Troy: Frank Calvert and Heinrich Schliemann at Hisarlik. Berkeley: University of California Press. ISBN 978-0-520-26136-5.
- Baker, Abigail (2020). Troy on Display: Scepticism and Wonder at Schliemann's First Exhibition. London: Bloomsbury. ISBN 978-1-350-11429-6.
- Burn, Lucilla (2005). "How Few Men Have the Right Head on Their Shoulders!". In Crummy, Nina (ed.). Image, Craft and the Classical World: Essays in Honour of Donald Bailey and Catherine Johns. Dremil-Lafage: Editions Mergoil. pp. 17–22. ISBN 2-907303-91-0.
- Fitton, J. Lesley (1991). Heinrich Schliemann and the British Museum. London: British Museum Press. ISBN 978-0-86159-083-4.
- Galanakis, Yannis; Nowak-Kemp, Malgosia (2013). "Ancient Greek Skulls in the Oxford University Museum, Part II: The Rhousopoulos–Rolleston Correspondence". Journal of the History of Collections. 25 (1): 1–17. doi:10.1093/jhc/fhq040.
- Galanakis, Yannis (17 October 2012a). "Guns, Drugs, and the Trafficking of Antiquities: Archaeology in 19th-century Greece". Center for Hellenic Studies Research Bulletin. Harvard University. Archived from the original on 31 March 2023.
- Galanakis, Yannis (30 November 2012b). "On Her Majesty's Service: C. L. W. Merlin and the Sourcing of Greek Antiquities for the British Museum". CHS Research Bulletin. 1 (1). Centre for Hellenic Studies.
- Galanakis, Yannis (31 October 2012c). ""University Professor – Antiquities Looter"?". Center for Hellenic Studies Research Bulletin. Harvard University. Archived from the original on 31 March 2023.
- Galanakis, Yannis (2014). "Arthur Evans and the Quest for the 'Origins of Mycenaean Culture'". In Bennet, John; Wilkinson, Toby; Galanakis, Yannis (eds.). Athyrmata: Critical Essays on the Archaeology of the Eastern Mediterranean in Honour of E. Susan Sherratt. Oxford: Archaeopress. pp. 85–98. ISBN 978-1-78491-019-8.
- Gekas, Sakis (2013). "The Crisis of the Long 1850s and Regime Change in the Ionian State and the Kingdom of Greece". The Historical Review/La Revue Historique. 10: 57–84. doi:10.12681/hr.306.
- Gere, Cathy (2010). Knossos and the Prophets of Modernism. Chicago: University of Chicago Press. ISBN 978-0-226-28955-7.
- Grammatikos, Alexander (2018). British Romantic Literature and the Emerging Modern Greek Nation. Palgrave Studies in the Enlightenment, Romanticism and Cultures of Print. Cham: Palgrave Macmillan. doi:10.1007/978-3-319-90440-5. ISBN 978-3-319-90439-9.
- Gunning, Lucia Patrizio; Vlami, Despina (2023). "Continuity and Change in the British Diplomatic service in the Levant: The 'Levantine' Question and the Lure of Antiquities". Journal of the History of Collections. doi:10.1093/jhc/fhad029.
- Jenkins, Ian (1990). "Acquisition and Supply of Casts of the Parthenon Sculptures by the British Museum, 1835–1939". Annual of the British School at Athens. 85: 89–114. doi:10.1017/S0068245400015598. JSTOR 30102843. S2CID 193237324.
- Judson, Anna P. (2020). The Undeciphered Signs of Linear B: Interpretation and Scribal Practices. Cambridge University Press. doi:10.1017/9781108859745. ISBN 978-1-108-85974-5.
- de Kleijn, Gerda (2016). "Fistulae and Water Fraud in Late Antique Constantinople". In Shilling, Brooke; Stephenson, Paul (eds.). Fountains and Water Culture in Byzantium. Cambridge: Cambridge University Press. pp. 55–67. doi:10.1017/CBO9781316226742. ISBN 978-1-107-10599-7.
- Payne, Emma M. (2019). "3D Imaging of the Parthenon Sculptures: An Assessment of the Archaeological Value of Nineteenth-Century Plaster Casts". Antiquity. 93 (372): 1625–1642. doi:10.15184/aqy.2019.179.
- Willocx, Louise (2020). "Athenian Commercial Weights: A History of Museum Collections and a General Overview of the Corpus". In Doyen, Charles; Willocx, Louise (eds.). Pondera antiqua et mediaevalia. Vol. 1. Louvain: Presses Universitaires de Louvain. pp. 23–46. ISBN 978-2-39061-082-3.
