= Hans Möbius =

Hans Möbius (2 February 1895, Frankfurt am Main – 28 November 1977, Bad Homburg) was a German classical archaeologist.

He studied at the Universities of Freiburg, Berlin and Marburg, receiving his doctorate at the latter institution in 1916 as a student of Paul Jacobsthal. From 1921 to 1928, he worked as an assistant to Ernst Buschor at the German Archaeological Institute at Athens, afterwards serving as a curator at the Hessiches Landesmuseum in Kassel. In 1943 he became a professor at the University of Würzburg, where he was appointed manager of the Martin von Wagner Museum. From 1946 onward, he worked on Ernst Pfuhl's corpus of eastern Greek funerary sculpture, Die ostgriechischen Grabreliefs.

== Selected works ==
- Die Ornamente der griechischen Grabstelen klassischer und nachklassischer Zeit, 1929 – Ornaments of the Greek grave stele of classical and post-classical eras.
- Alexandria und Rom, 1964 – Alexandria and Rome.
- Die Reliefs der Portlandvase und das antike Dreifigurenbild, 1965 – The reliefs of the Portland Vase and the ancient three-character image.
- Studia varia. Aufsätze zur Kunst und Kultur der Antike mit Nachträgen, 1967 (edited by Wolfgang Schiering) – Studia varia. Essays on art and culture of antiquity, as amended.
