= Arthur MacGregor =

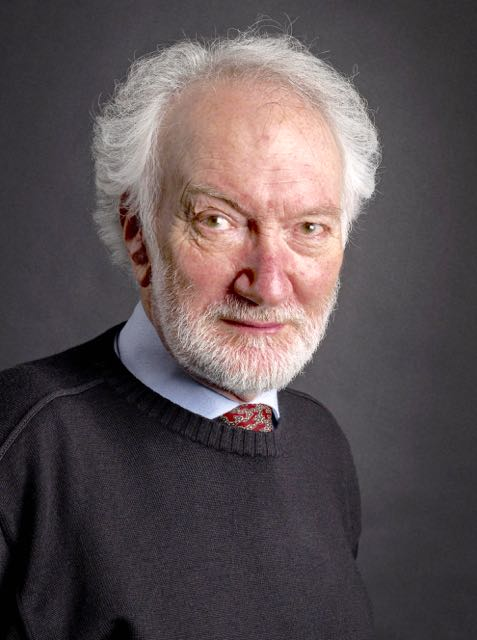
MacGregor in 2008

Arthur MacGregor is a British academic and author, "who largely invented the idea of the history of museums".

MacGregor has spent most of his career at the Ashmolean Museum, before his appointment as director of the Society of Antiquaries.

He has been president of the Society for the History of Natural History since 2015, when he succeeded Hugh Torrens.

MacGregor is founder of the Journal of the History of Collections which he edited from 1989-2023.

== Selected works ==
- 2024. St Helena : An Island Biography. BOYDELL PRESS.
- 2023. The India Museum Revisited. UCL Press.
- 2018. Naturalists in the Field: Collecting Recording and Preserving the Natural World from the Fifteenth to the Twenty-First Century. (editor) 2018. Leiden: Brill.
- 2018. Company Curiosities : Nature Culture and the East India Company 1600-1874. 2018. London: Reaktion Books.
- 2015. The Cobbe Cabinet of Curiosities: An Anglo-Irish Country House Museum. New Haven: Published for the Paul Mellon Centre for Studies in British Art by Yale University Press.
- 2012. Animal Encounters : Human and Animal Interaction in Britain from the Norman Conquest to World War One. London: Reaktion Books.
- 2007. Curiosity and Enlightenment: Collectors and Collections from the Sixteenth to the Nineteenth Century. New Haven Conn: Yale University Press.
- 2000. The Ashmolean Museum Oxford. Munich: Prestel.
- 1994. Sir Hans Sloane: Collector Scientist Antiquary Founding Father of the British Museum. London: Published for the Trustees of the British Museum by British Museum Press in association with Alistair McAlpine.
- 1985. (with Oliver Impey). The Origins of Museums: The Cabinet of Curiosities in Sixteenth and Seventeenth Century Europe. 1985. Oxford: Clarendon.
