= Sidney Merlin =

British sport shooter

Medal record

Men's shooting

Representing United Kingdom

Intercalated Games
Gold medal – first place	1906 Athens	Trap, double shot
Bronze medal – third place	1906 Athens	Trap, single shot

Sidney Louis Walter Merlin (Greek: Σίδνεϋ Μέρλιν; 26 April 1856 – 14 July 1951) was a British botanist and sports shooter. He competed at the 1896 Summer Olympics and the 1906 Intercalated Games in Athens. He was born in Piraeus and died in Athens.

== Life ==
His family had lived in Greece since the 1830s, where his father, Charles William Louis Merlin, was British Consul at Piraeus. His mother, Isabella (née Green), was an important figure in the British community in Athens. He was the Ionian Bank's agent at Piraeus/Athens from March 1853, and subsequently became, from autumn 1865, the bank's general inspector in Greece while continuing to be its agent at Athens and, from May 1890, a director in London of the bank. Sidney was born in Piraeus, and married Zaira Theotokis, the daughter of the Corfiot Prime Minister Georgios Theotokis. They had a daughter, Adela Maria ( Maraki) Lappas, née Merlin, a novelist, WW2 war correspondent and potter. He later divorced Zaira and married Kakia Inglessi, Greek by birth, whose aristocratic family had lived in Russia before the revolution. Edwin, their only child, served in the Royal Air Force in England during the Second World War. The Merlins were large landowners in Corfu, Crete, Lamia and Attica.

In the 1896 Olympics, Merlin competed in four of the five shooting events. In the military rifle, he placed tenth with 1,156 points. His first (of four) string of 10 shots resulted in a score of 477. His score and place in the free rifle are unknown, but he did not win a medal. After two out of the five strings of 6 shots in the military pistol event, Merlin quit the competition. Similarly, he did not finish the rapid-fire pistol event. He also participated in the men's trap shooting at the 1900 Paris Games, where he came joint seventh with five other athletes. At the 1906 Games, he participated in all shooting events, coming in first and third in the men's trap, double shot and single shot, respectively.

As the Germans approached Athens during World War II, Sidney Merlin and his second wife, Kakia, moved to the Merlin estate on Crete, a large mansion dating back to Venetian times. The mansion, known as Bella Capina (Pelakapina in some spellings), also provided a residence for King George II and meeting rooms for the Greek War Cabinet and government for several months. This ended abruptly when the German aerial invasion of the island began. The King and Prime Minister, having been warned in advance, left the day before the invasion. This is historically interesting, as it is one of the very few occasions when information from Bletchley Park, where German intelligence was decoded by the British, was given to non-British individuals. Sidney and Kakia remained with the task of keeping the house running as if the King were still in residence. When the German advance was within shooting distance, Sidney, Kakia and a small entourage of other British household members fled on foot, making an arduous crossing of the island to the southern village of Sphakia, where they were rescued by the British destroyer, HMS Napier, and taken to Alexandria, Egypt.

In Greece, Sidney Merlin is best known for two botanological achievements. In ca. 1925, he introduced the "Washington Navel" orange variety to his estate in Corfu. To this day, it is known in Greece as "Merlin". He also introduced the kumquat tree, which is used in Corfu to make the kumquat sweet, one of the specialities of Corfiot cuisine, and the Butter of Corfu (Βούτυρο Κέρκυρας).
