= Stefanos Koumanoudis =

Greek archaeologist, teacher and writer

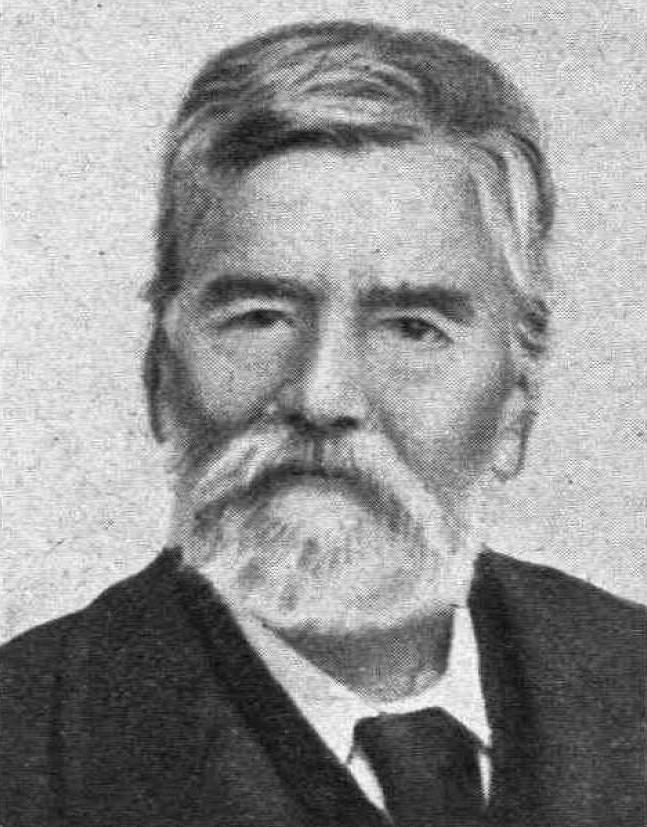
- Stefanos Koumanoudis at an advanced age
- Born: 1818; Adrianople
- Died: 31 May 1899 (aged 80–81); Athens
- Education: Humboldt University of Berlin, University of Paris
- Occupations: Archaeologist, university teacher, writer, translator
- Employer(s): University of Athens, Archaeological Society of Athens

Signature
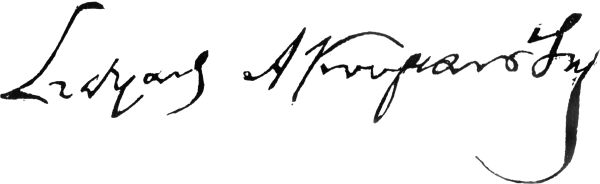

Stefanos Koumanoudis (Greek: Στέφανος Κουμανούδης, 1818–1899) was a Greek archaeologist, teacher and writer of the 19th century.

== Biography ==
He was born in 1818 in Adrianople to a rich merchant family. In an early age, his family settled in Bucharest, and later in Silistra where he spent most of his childhood. He graduated from the Humboldt University of Berlin and the University of Paris. Fellow university students of Koumanoudis were Efthymios Kastorchis, Iraklis Mitsopoulos, Lysandros Kavtantzoglou and Emmanuel Kokkinos, who became notable teachers and archaeologists as well.

He became a lecturer in 1845, and in 1846 he was appointed a professor of Latin philology of the University of Athens. In 1854 he was elected dean of the Philosophical School of the university, and in the later years 3 more times (1855–1856, 1866–1867, 1877–1888, 1884–1885). He retired in August 1886 after forty years of active teaching. His subjects mostly concerned the history of Roman letters, the life of the Romans and the interpretation of the Latin poets and writers. He was a teacher of the later King George I and his wife Olga. He had been a secretary of the Archaeological Society of Athens for 36 years. Among his discoveries, during his tenure at the Archaeological Society, were the Stoa of Attalos, Hadrian's Library, the Theatre of Dionysus, the Dipylon and the Kerameikos.

He was also a member of the Institut de France, the Prussian Academy of Sciences and the Göttingen Academy of Sciences. He died on 31 May 1899 (Gregorian calendar), and was buried the following day.

=== Writings ===
He wrote excavation reports and epigraphic publications, dictionaries and commentary versions of classical works and translated several Serbian folk songs as well as works by Voltaire. His diary was preserved and transcribed by his great-grandson, fellow philologist Stefanos N. Koumanoudis, and published in 1980. He also enriched and translated the Latin dictionary of Heinrich Ulrichs (1807–1843), and in 1883 contributed to the re-issue of the Archaeological Journal, and from 1861 to 1863 he published the historical journal «Philistor» (Φιλίστωρ). He also published, with Efthymios Kastorchis, the journal «Athinaion» (Αθήναιον).
