= Ernst Pfuhl =

German classical archaeologist

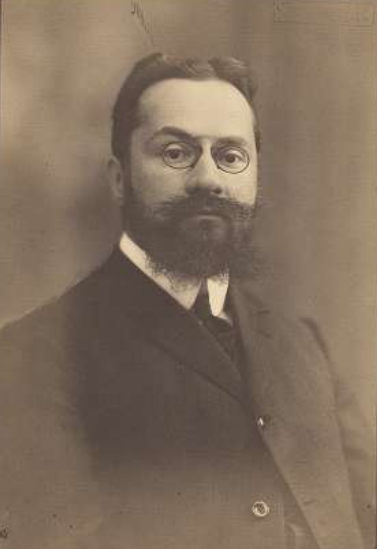
Ernst Pfuhl in 1910

Ernst Pfuhl (17 November 1876, Charlottenburg – 7 August 1940, Basel) was a German-Swiss classical archaeologist and art historian. He was the son of sculptor Johannes Pfuhl (1846–1914) and a son-in-law to art dealer Athanasios Rhousopoulos (1823–1898).

== Biography ==
He studied under Reinhard Kekulé von Stradonitz and Ulrich von Wilamowitz-Moellendorff at the University of Berlin, and later on, performed excavations at the necropolis at Thera as an assistant to Friedrich Hiller von Gaertringen. In 1905 he received his habilitation at the University of Göttingen, and in 1911, became a "full professor" at the University of Basel. At Basel he founded the Archäologische Seminar in 1912. He remained at Basel until his death in 1940, his successor being Karl Schefold. In 1941 his personal art collection was auctioned in Lucerne.

== Works ==
In 1923 he published his main work, titled Malerei und Zeichnung der Griechen; and during the following year, a shortened version was issued ("Meisterwerke griechischer Zeichnung und Malerei"), which was later translated into English by John Beazley and published as "Masterpieces of Greek Drawing and Painting" (1926). In 1946 Hans Möbius took charge of compiling Pfuhl's corpus of Greek grave reliefs — these were eventually published in 1977 as Die ostgriechischen Grabreliefs. Other significant literary works by Pfuhl are:

- De Atheniensium pompis sacris. Berlin 1900.
- Der archaische Friedhof am Stadtberge von Thera. Athen, 1903 – Archaic cemetery on the city hills of Thera.
- Die Anfänge der griechischen Bildniskunst. Ein Beitrag zur Geschichte der Individualität. Munich 1927 – The beginnings of Greek portraiture. A contribution to the history of individuality.
- Ostgriechische Reisen. Kleinasien, Kypros und Syrien'. Basel 1941 – Eastern Greek travels: Asia Minor, Cyprus and Syria.

Pfuhl also contributed numerous articles to the second edition of the Realencyclopädie der Classischen Altertumswissenschaft.
