= Journal of the History of Collections =

- Language: English

Publication details
- Publisher: Oxford University Press (United Kingdom)

Standard abbreviations
- ISO 4: J. Hist. Collect.

Indexing
- ISSN: 0954-6650 (print); 1477-8564 (web)

The Journal of the History of Collections is a peer reviewed academic journal of the history of collectors and collecting. It is published by Oxford University Press.

An editorial in the first issue noted, "At the birth of this new journal, it is appropriate to acknowledge its parentage. In 1983 there took place in Oxford a week-long symposium on the subject of sixteenth- and seventeenth-century cabinets of curiosities, whose proceedings were later published by Oxford University Press under the title The Origins of Museums. The sustained interest generated by that volume has encouraged the publishers and the editors in launching this new venture, in which continuing expression will be given to the themes investigated in the earlier publication and to subsequent developments in the aims, methods and history of collecting."

The founding editor, Arthur MacGregor, was editor from 1989 to 2023. He was curator at the Ashmolean in Oxford.
