= Karl Schefold =

Swiss-German archaeologist (1905–1999)

- Born: 26 January 1905; Heilbronn, German Empire
- Died: 16 April 1999 (aged 94); Basel, Switzerland
- Occupation: Classical archaeologist
- Spouse: Marianne von den Steinen

Karl Schefold (Austrian German: [ˈʃeːfɔld]; 26 January 1905 – 16 April 1999) was a classical archaeologist based in Basel, Switzerland. Born and educated in Germany, he was forced in 1935 to emigrate to Switzerland, which he adopted as his home country. His speciality was in the religious content of ancient art, which he interpreted from a perspective informed by the scientific tradition and shaped by the poetic tradition of the German classical period and the ideals of the poet Stefan George.

== Life ==
After attending high school at the Eberhard-Ludwigs-Gymnasium in Stuttgart, he began his study of the ancient world at Tübingen and Heidelberg University. He met his future wife, Marianne von den Steinen, there. He went on to study at Jena, and in 1930 completed his doctorate at Marburg under the supervision of Paul Jacobsthal. Later he worked especially at the German Archaeological Institute in Rome and Athens, and participated in excavations at Larisa in Thessaly.

He was married on 5 February 1935 to Marianne von den Steinen, daughter of Karl von den Steinen, a well-known ethnologist. Concerned by developments in Germany, he moved to Basel the same year, and there completed his Habilitation in classical archaeology. At first, he specialised in near-eastern and early-Christian archaeology. After the death of Ernst Pfuhl in 1940, he gradually became more and more responsible for all areas of teaching and finally, in 1953, the chair was transferred to him. He declined numerous appointments in other countries; through his research, and the foundation of a museum of antiquities, he developed the field of archaeology at Basel.

Schefold was a member of the German, Austrian, and American archaeological institutes, and of the Bavarian and British Academy of Sciences. He held an honorary doctorate at the University of Thessaloniki. With Herbert A. Cahn he founded the Antikenmuseum Basel, the first museum for ancient art in Switzerland.

He had at three sons, Dian Schefold, Professor for public law in Bremen, Germany, Reimar Schefold, Professor for cultural anthropology, who lives in Amsterdam, Netherlands, and Bertram Schefold, Professor for Economics in Frankfurt, Germany.

== Work ==
Schefold was known for his work on late-classical Attic vases, on the art of the Scythians in southern Russia, and his excavations at Larisa and Eretria. During his time in Basel he worked to maintain connections between America and Europe in difficult times.

After finishing the five-volume Griechische Sagenbilder ("Greek myth in art", 1964–1993) he focused in his last years on revising and expanding the book Die Bildnisse der antiken Dichter, Redner und Denker ("Depictions of ancient poets, orators, and thinkers", 1943, revised edition 1997); a summary and revision of his earlier work, Der religiöse Gehalt der antiken Kunst und die Offenbarung ("The religious content of ancient art and the Revelation", 1998), and Hugo von Hofmannsthals Bild von Stefan George ("Hugo von Hofmannsthal's depiction of Stefan George", 1998).
