= Schliemann (disambiguation) =

Schliemann most often refers to:

- Heinrich Schliemann (1822–1890), German pioneer in archaeology

Schliemann may also refer to:

== People ==
- Agamemnon Schliemann (1878–1954), Greek ambassador to the United States, son of Heinrich
- Christian Schliemann (born 1962), German field hockey player
- Luise Therese Sophie Schliemann (1793–1831) mother of Heinrich Schliemann

== Other uses ==
- Schliemann Defence, an opening in the game of chess
- Schliemann Gold (aka Priam's Treasure), a cache of gold and artifacts discovered by Heinrich Schliemann
- 3302 Schliemann, a main-belt asteroid
- Schliemann (crater), a lunar impact crater on the far side of the Moon
