= Mask of Agamemnon =

Gold funeral mask discovered at the ancient Greek site of Mycenae

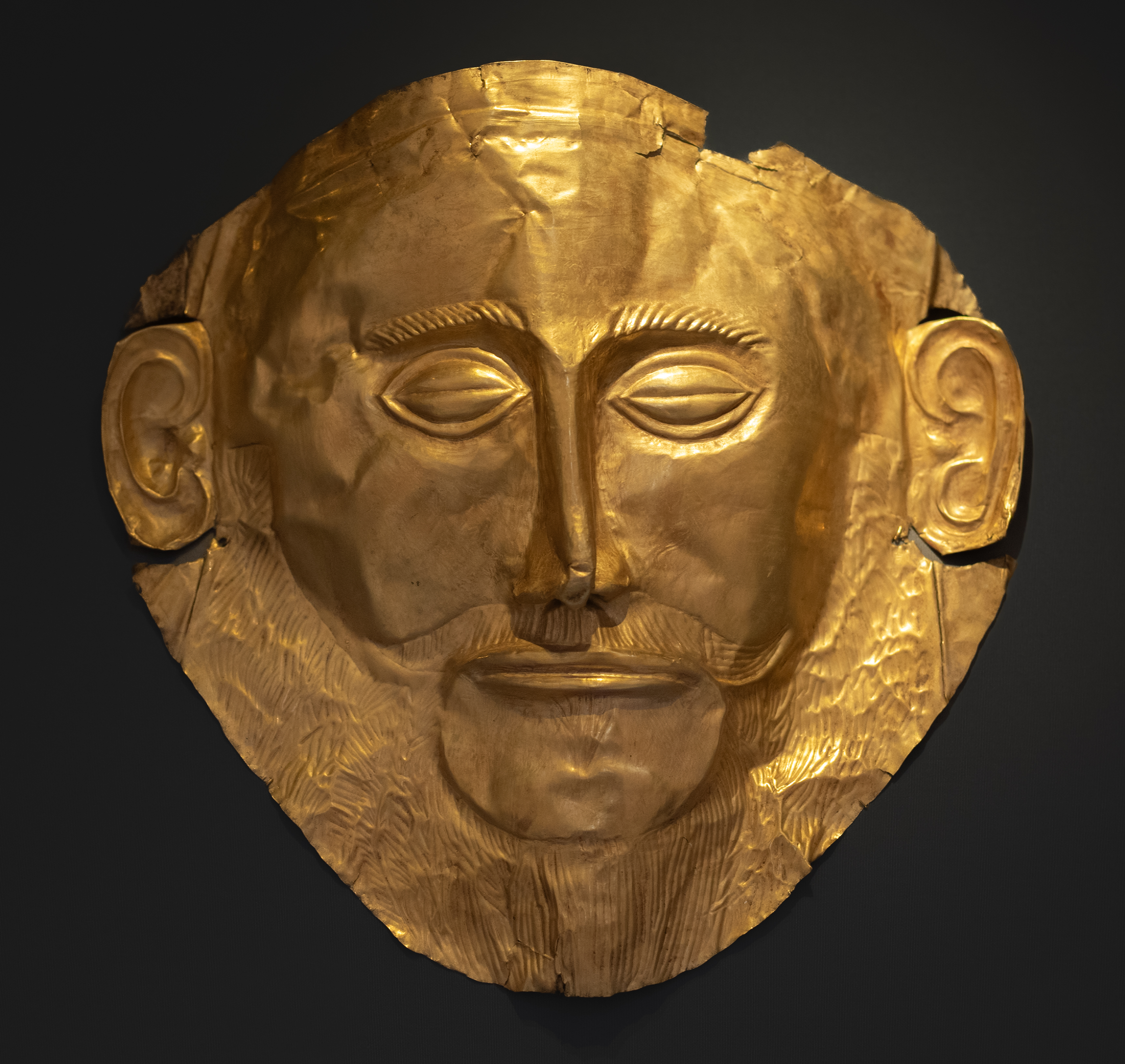
- Material: Gold
- Created: c. 1525 BC
- Discovered: 1876; Mycenae, Peloponnese, Greece
- Discovered by: Heinrich Schliemann
- Present location: National Archaeological Museum, Attica, Greece

The Mask of Agamemnon is a gold funerary mask which was discovered at the Bronze Age site of Mycenae in southern Greece. The mask, displayed in the National Archaeological Museum of Athens, has been described by the historian Cathy Gere as the "Mona Lisa of prehistory".

German archaeologist Heinrich Schliemann, who discovered the artifact in 1876, believed that he had found the body of the Mycenaean king Agamemnon, leader of the Achaeans in the ancient Greek epic of the Trojan War, the Iliad. Modern archaeological research suggests that the mask dates to around the 16th century BC, pre-dating the period of the mythical Trojan War by 300–400 years.

== Discovery ==
Heinrich Schliemann found the gold funeral mask in 1876 in a shaft tomb designated Grave V, at the site Grave Circle A, Mycenae. A total of eight men were discovered in Grave Circle A, all of whom had weapons in their graves, but only five had masks; those were in Grave IV and Grave V.

The quantities of gold and carefully worked artifacts indicate honor, wealth and status. The Mask of Agamemnon was named by Schliemann after the legendary Greek king Agamemnon of Homer's Iliad. Schliemann took this as evidence the Trojan War was a real historical event.

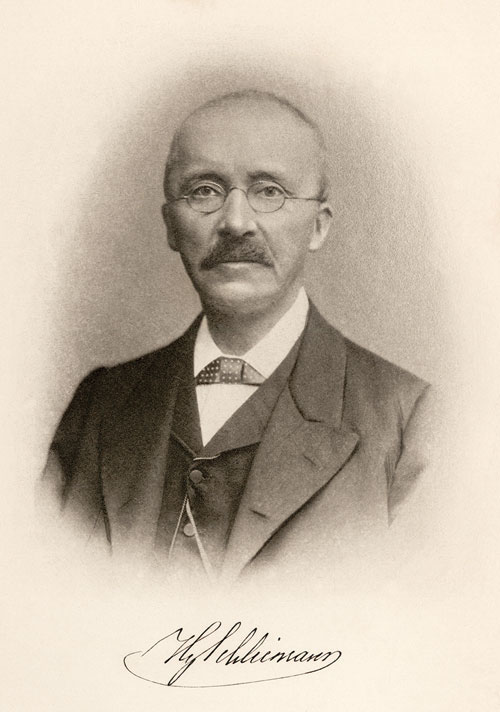
Portrait of Heinrich Schliemann

The Mask of Agamemnon was created from a single thick gold sheet, heated and hammered against a wooden background with the details chased on later with a sharp tool. Following his discoveries at the site, Schliemann notified King George I. He is supposed to have told the king in a telegraph, "I have gazed upon the face of Agamemnon". Schliemann later named his son after the legendary king. Close to the end of his life, the archaeologist accepted doubts as to the mask's true owner and is quoted as saying, "So this is not Agamemnon ... these are not his ornaments? All right, let's call him Schulze."

== Authenticity ==
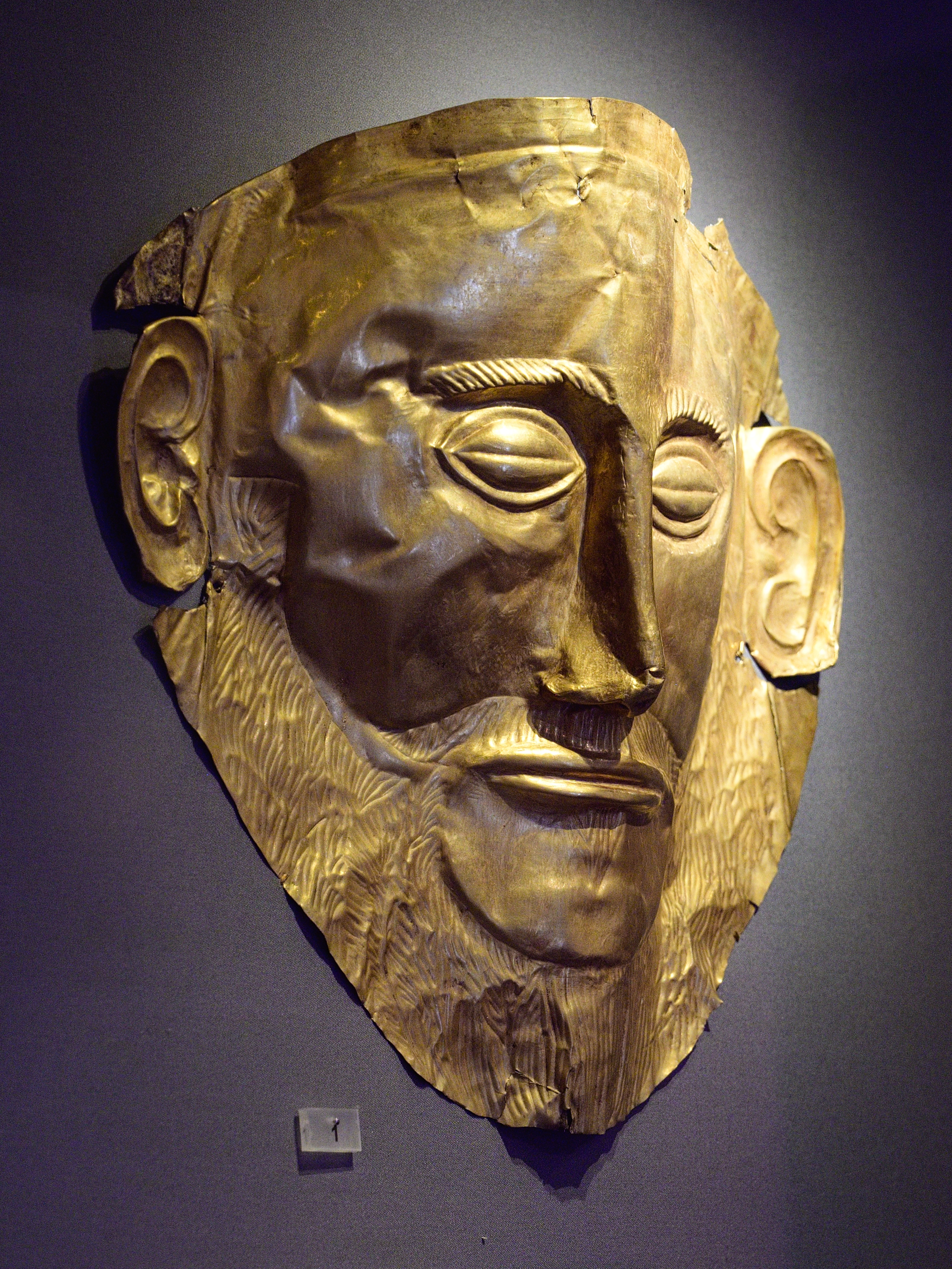
The mask in the National Archaeological Museum

In the latter half of the 20th century and the beginning of the 21st century, the authenticity of the mask has been formally questioned, primarily by William Calder III and David Traill. Archaeology magazine has run a series of articles presenting both sides of the debate. By the time of the excavation of the Shaft Graves, the Greek Archaeological Society had taken a hand in supervising Schliemann's work (after the issues at Troy), sending Panagiotis Stamatakis as ephor, or director, of the excavation, who kept a close eye on Schliemann.

Proponents of the fraud argument center their case on Schliemann's reputation for salting digs with artefacts from elsewhere. The resourceful Schliemann, they assert, could have had the mask manufactured on the general model of the other Mycenaean masks and found an opportunity to place it in the excavation.

The defending advocate(s) point out that the excavation was closed on November 26–27 for Sunday holiday and rain. It was not allowed to reopen until Stamatakis had provided the work with credible witnesses. The three other masks were not discovered until the 28th. The Mask of Agamemnon was found on the 30th.

A second critique is based on style. The Mask of Agamemnon differs from three of the other masks in a number of ways: it is three-dimensional rather than flat, one of the facial hairs is cut out, rather than engraved, the ears are cut out, the eyes are depicted as both open and shut, with open eyelids, but a line of closed eyelids across the center, the face alone of all the depictions of faces in Mycenaean art has a full pointed beard with handlebar moustache, the mouth is well-defined (compared to the flat masks), the brows are formed to two arches rather than one.

The defense presented prior arguments that the shape of the lip, the triangular beard and the detail of the beard are nearly the same as the mane and locks of the gold lion-head rhyton from Shaft Grave IV. Schliemann's duplicity, they claim, has been greatly exaggerated, and they also claim that the attackers were conducting a vendetta.

Modern archaeological research suggests that the mask is genuine but pre-dates the period of the Trojan War by 300–400 years. Others date the contents of the find even earlier, to around 2500 BC.

== See also ==
- Achaeans (Homer)
- Teres I
- Golden Bust of Septimius Severus
