= 859 Syrian coast earthquake =

Earthquake affected the Syrian coast in 859/860

- Location within Syria
- Local date: 30 December 859 – 29 January 860
- Epicenter: 36.0°N 36.0°E
- Areas affected: Abbasid Caliphate (now Turkey and Syria)
- Max. intensity: MMI VIII (Severe)
- Casualties: Many victims

The 859 Syrian coast earthquake affected the Mediterranean coast of Syria in the year 859 or 860 CE (Hijri year 245). It caused almost the complete destruction of Latakia and Jableh, major damage at Antioch and led to many deaths.

== Earthquake ==
There are various estimated dates for the earthquake, ranging from 8 April 859 to 27 March, 860, although most chroniclers put it in the month of Shawwal, 30 December 859 to 29 January 860.

There are several accounts of this earthquake affecting a very large area, including the cities of Acre (Akka), Adana, Antioch, Baghdad, Balisum, Buka, Harrana, Homs (Emesa), Madatinum, Maresha (Marisa), Rasulaicum, Samandağ, and Uti. Besides Syria, other reportedly affected areas were Anatolia (Asia Minor), the Arabian Peninsula, Egypt, and Palestine. All accounts speak of great property damage and loss of life. However, it is probable that the effects of several earthquakes were conflated into a narrative of a single great earthquake.

At Antioch, the aftershocks continued for several months.

== Damage ==
The coastal towns of Latakia and Jableh were most strongly affected, with both suffering almost complete destruction. Antioch to the north was also badly affected, with 1,500 large buildings being destroyed and somewhere between 70 and 190 of the towers on the city's walls collapsing.

Part of the Jebel Aqra appears to have collapsed into the sea, although the historian Al-Suyuti (16th century) reported that the earthquake shattered an entire mountain in the vicinity of Antioch. The remains of the mountain reportedly fell into the Mediterranean Sea, taking with them 1005 houses and 90 villages, although the particular edition of the work in which these facts appear is described as "very confused". The same account of the shattered mountain appears in the works of Al-Tabari (9th–10th century), George Elmacin (13th century), and Bar Hebraeus (13th century).

Accounts of this earthquake that describe the collapse of Jebel Aqra into the sea, say that it was followed by the withdrawal of the sea from the coast and that the water returned, surging to the shores. This is likely a description of a tsunami. The description of the event is similar to the description of a 551 tsunami provided by George Kedrenos (11th century).
