= Panagiotis Stamatakis =

Greek archaeologist (c. 1840–1885)

- Παναγιώτης Σταματάκης
- The only conjectured photograph of Stamatakis, taken during the excavation of Grave Circle A at Mycenae in 1876 (Note: The identification is uncertain.)
- Born: c. 1835; Varvitsa, Laconia, Greece
- Died: 31 March [O.S. 19 March] 1885 (aged c. 50); Piraeus, Athens
- Occupation: Archaeologist
- Known for: Excavations around Greece, particularly at Mycenae
- Title: Ephor General (1884–1885)

Signature
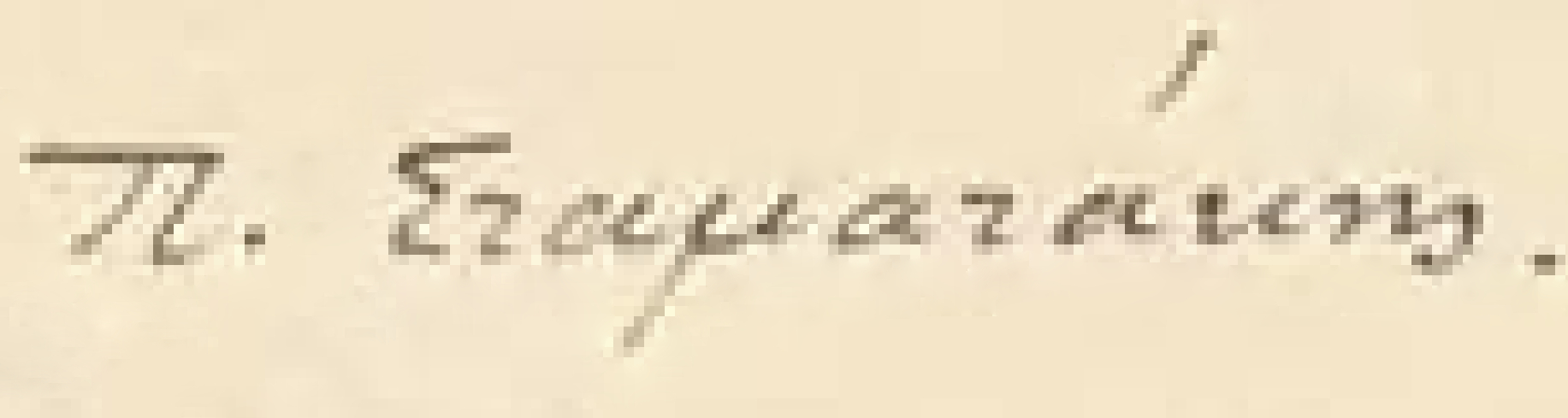

Panagiotis Stamatakis (Greek: Παναγιώτης Σταματάκης; c. 1835 (Note: Stamatakis' precise date of birth is not known: Petrakos approximates it to 1835, assuming that he took his demotic school exams (in 1845) at approximately the age of ten. Traill gives it as "about 1840", while Stamatakis's contemporary Minos Lappas, who wrote his eulogy, said that he devoted his life to archaeology "from the age of twenty". Since he began working for the Ephor General of Antiquities in 1866, this would support a birth date no later than 1846.) – 1885) (sometimes anglicised as Panayotis or Stamatakes) was a Greek archaeologist. He is noted particularly for his role in supervising the excavations of Heinrich Schliemann at Mycenae in 1876, and his role in recording and preserving the archaeological remains at the site.

Most of Stamatakis's early life is obscure: he was born in the village of Varvitsa in Laconia, and had no university education or formal archaeological training. He was hired as an employee of the Greek Ministry of Religious Affairs and Public Education in 1863, and recruited in 1866 as an assistant to Panagiotis Efstratiadis, the Ephor General of Antiquities leading the Greek Archaeological Service. Over the following two decades, Stamatakis travelled and excavated widely throughout Greece. His major role was as a travelling official, or "apostle", working variously for the Archaeological Service and the Archaeological Society of Athens: in this capacity, he investigated antiquities crimes and founded museum collections throughout Greece. He was particularly prolific in the region of Boeotia, where he excavated at Tanagra, at Chaeronea and Thespiai, and established the Archaeological Museum of Thebes.

Between 1876 and 1877, Stamatakis was deputised by Efstratiadis to represent the Greek government and the Archaeological Society at the excavations of Mycenae, which were being conducted by Heinrich Schliemann on the society's behalf. Both Stamatakis and Efstratiadis distrusted Schliemann's integrity, and Stamatakis frequently opposed Schliemann's methodology, which paid little attention to accurate record-keeping or to the preservation of cultural material Schliemann deemed uninteresting. After Schliemann's departure from Mycenae late in 1876, Stamatakis discovered additional tombs at the site, completed the excavation and organised the public exhibition of its finds.

Stamatakis was promoted to Ephor General in 1884. After his premature death in 1885, his work was largely forgotten, and most of his excavations remained unpublished. (Note: A 2006 study reassessing his impact on the excavations of Mycenae called him an "underrated and elusive figure".) Modern reassessment of the excavations at Mycenae, fuelled in large part by the rediscovery in the early 21st century of Stamatakis's notebooks from the site, led in turn to a re-evaluation of his importance to the Mycenae excavations and to Greek archaeology: he has been described as "one of the great Greek archaeologists of the nineteenth century".

== Life and career ==
Panagiotis Stamatakis was born in the village of Varvitsa (now part of the municipality of Sparta) in Laconia; his father's name was Antonios. Almost nothing is known of Stamatakis's early life: he attended the demotic school of Varvitsa, which had only a single class of students, and took his graduation exams on 6 July [O.S. 24 June] 1845. He had no university education, and appears to have been largely self-taught in archaeology. On 19 August [O.S. 7 August] 1863, he became a secretary to the Greek Ministry of Religious Affairs and Public Education, which had oversight of the Greek Archaeological Service. He was sent to the island of Melos in October 1864, reporting to Panagiotis Efstratiadis, the Ephor General of Antiquities in charge of the Archaeological Service. On Melos, he met a tomb-robber surnamed Nostraki and moved a Roman-period stele excavated there by him to Athens, also transcribing its inscription. He secured two inscribed stelai for the state from a man named Ramvias, cutting each in half to be sent to Athens, as the complete objects were too heavy to transport. Stamatakis was due to return to Athens before 21 November [O.S. 9 November], but stayed later, without Efstratiadis's permission, to continue his work. In November and December 1864, he bought several looted artefacts on Melos, including coins, works of statuary and pottery, and transferred them to Athens.

In January 1866, Stamatakis was hired as an assistant to Efstratiadis. Stamatakis was sent immediately to Sparta, where he reported on 27 June [O.S. 15 June] the discovery of an ancient statue that had been illegally excavated and concealed in a merchant's house. He was sworn in as a civil servant on 28 July [O.S. 15 July]. (Note: Greece adopted the Gregorian calendar in 1923; 28 February [O.S. 15 February] was followed by 1 March. In this article, this date and all subsequent dates are given in the 'New Style' Gregorian calendar, while dates before it are given in the 'Old Style' Julian calendar.) His primary task was to record antiquities held in private collections, and so to enable the Archaeological Service to gain an understanding of the number and condition of ancient finds unearthed to date. He joined the Archaeological Society of Athens, a learned society with a prominent role in the excavation and conservation of ancient monuments, on 14 November [O.S. 2 November] 1867, but was excused paying its membership fees until 1871 on account of his limited finances.

In 1867, he oversaw excavations in Athens; in 1868, he began a lifelong campaign of travel to monitor excavations and antiquities crime throughout Greece, travelling to Thebes, Plataea and Chaeronea in Boeotia. Between 1870 and 1885, he was the only Greek archaeological official responsible for heritage protection outside Athens. During his early career, he seems to have had financial difficulties: he requested that his salary for August 1866 be paid to somebody by the name of Apostolos Verropoulos, possibly his creditor, and on 15 April [O.S. 3 April] 1868 he was sued by a creditor for an unpaid debt of fifty drachmas. (Note: By way of comparison, the Ephor General earned 400 drachmas a month, slightly more than the 350 paid to a professor at the University of Athens.) On 24 December [O.S. 12 December] 1869, his salary was temporarily confiscated by court order to pay a debt of 270 drachmas; shortly afterwards, on 28 December [O.S. 16 December], Dimitrios Saravas, the minister responsible for the Archaeological Service, approved a payment of 50 drachmas to Stamatakis for "extraordinary service to the Archaeological Service".

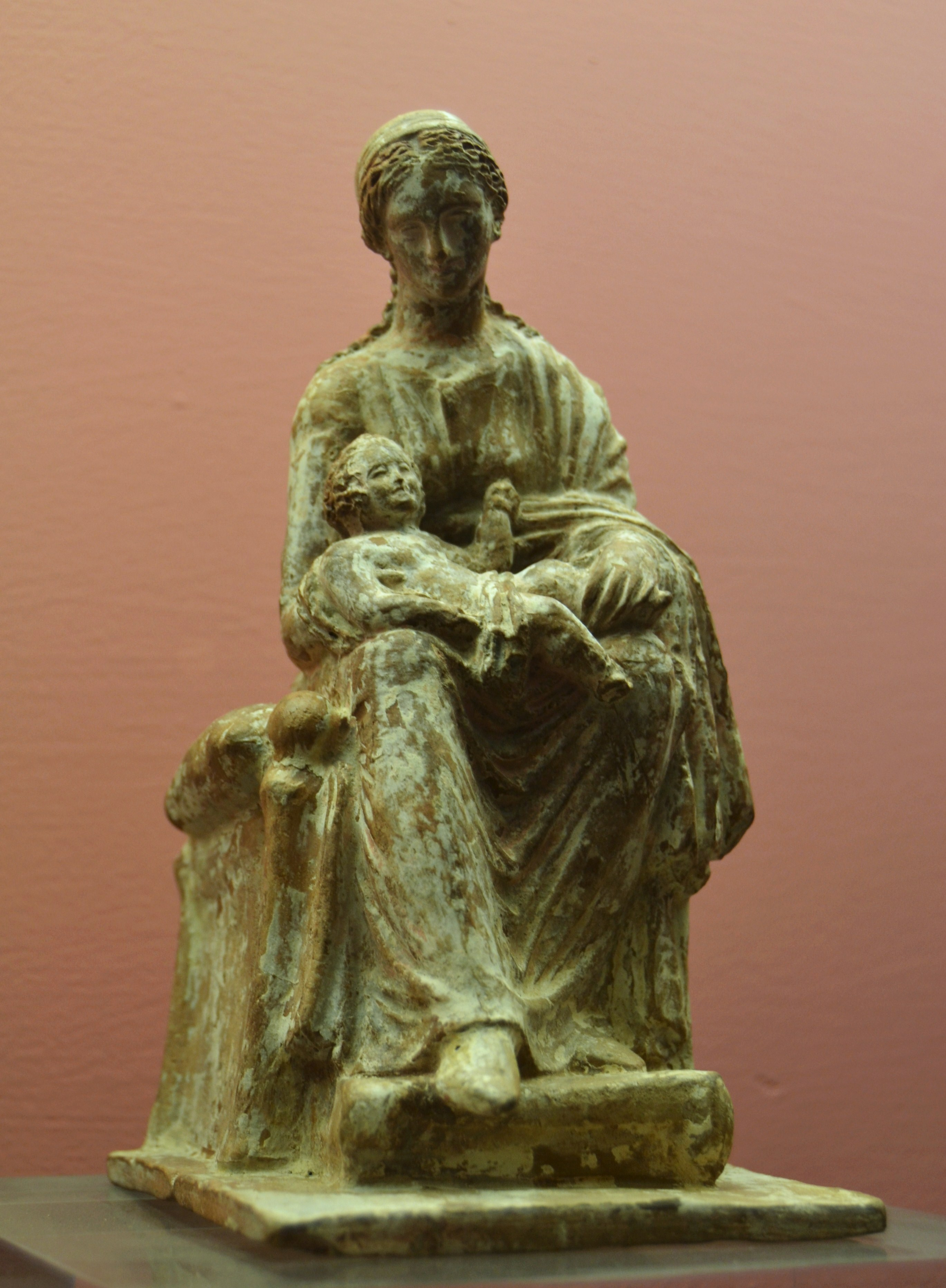
Terracotta figurine from Tanagra, Hellenistic period. The looting of figurines was a reason behind Stamatakis's excavations of 1873–1875.

In 1871, then working as an assistant in the Archaeological Office of the Ministry of Education, Stamatakis was invited by the Archaeological Society to become a travelling ephor, (Note: Since its foundation in 1834, the Greek Archaeological Service had employed only one member of staff, plus occasional assistants. The Archaeological Society of Athens, formed in 1837, aimed to support the Greek state in matters of antiquities management and protection, but remained (and remains) distinct from the Greek Archaeological Service and the Greek government.) known as an "apostle", for it. A major part of his role as an apostle was to persuade citizens to surrender illegally-excavated antiquities to the state. His energetic approach to these efforts, later described as "tireless in his work, unyielding in the discharge of his duties and unshakeable in the matters of ethics", led to the establishment of public archaeological collections throughout Greece, and the basis for many future archaeological museums, including those at Thebes, Chaeronea, Thespiai and Tanagra, the first such collections in Boeotia. In 1872, he was sent to Laconia to catalogue the antiquities in private collections there; this was the first time a professional archaeologist had worked in the region.

On 15 March [O.S. 3 March] 1875, he was given the post of ephor of the Peloponnese by the Archaeological Service, which was at that time expanding its ranks to include a number of such officers. The post carried a monthly salary of 250 drachmas. In the royal decree establishing his position, Stamatakis was also listed as a graduate student of the University of Athens, though he may have attended lectures there informally rather than being officially enrolled. By 2 August [O.S. 21 July], he had been transferred to have responsibility for central Greece. During the same year, he established the Archaeological Museum of Sparta, building its collection largely from illegally-excavated artefacts recovered during his time in Laconia. He offered his resignation from the Archaeological Service on 10 April [O.S. 29 March] – according to Petrakos, for the fourth or fifth time – in protest at his treatment by his superiors, but had withdrawn it and returned to Athens by 14 April [O.S. 2 April]. He was promptly reassigned to Attica, where he was sent to Merenta to purchase inscriptions for the state; he made his report from there on 24 April [O.S. 12 April].

During his career, Stamatakis travelled and excavated widely in Greece. He discovered and excavated a tholos tomb at the site of the Heraion of Argos in May 1875, (Note: Antonaccio 1992, p. 100; Petrakos 2022, p. 188 (for the date).) and his finds in Argos formed the basis for the early collection of the Archaeological Museum of Argos, opened in 1878. He campaigned in Boeotia against the illegal excavation and trade of antiquities from 1871 onwards, carrying out excavations in 1873–1875 at Tanagra following the illegal looting of the necropolis there in the early 1870s, where the looting of around 10,000 tombs had raised concerns about antiquities looting and smuggling among the Greek press and population. His excavations brought to light various funerary reliefs and inscriptions. He also worked in the Aegean islands, producing the first archaeological maps of Delos and Mykonos. From 1872 to 1873, he stayed on Delos to supervise the excavation of the French School at Athens at the sanctuary of Heracles, directed by J. Albert Lebègue.

== Excavations at Mycenae, 1876–1877 ==
=== Background to the excavations ===
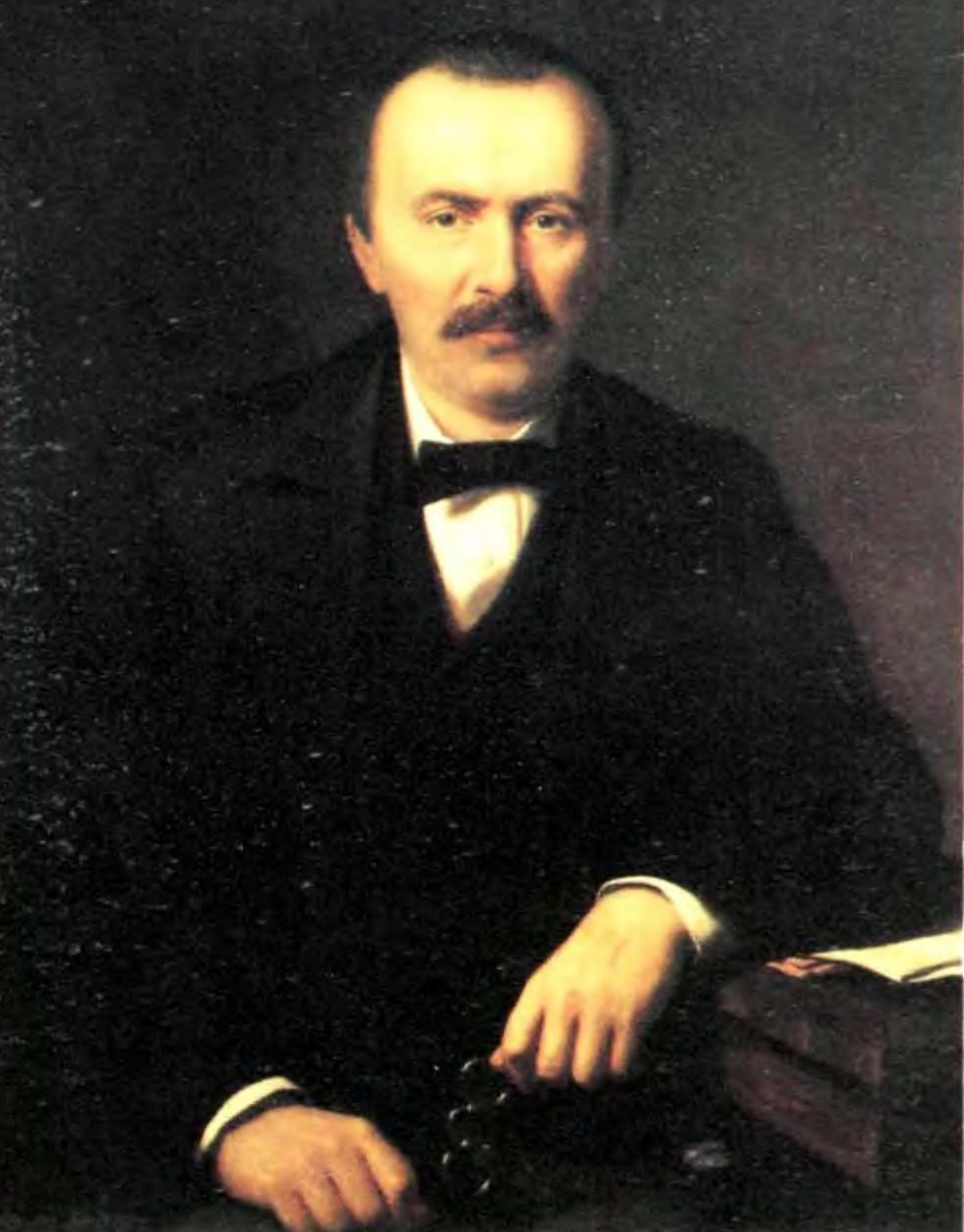
An 1877 portrait of Heinrich Schliemann

The German archaeologist and businessman Heinrich Schliemann first visited Mycenae in 1868, and tried unsuccessfully to secure a permit to excavate there throughout the early 1870s. The permit to excavate at the site belonged to the Archaeological Society of Athens, and Schliemann wrote in January 1870 to Stefanos Koumanoudis, secretary of the society, offering to excavate the site on their behalf. In this letter, he expressed his belief that the royal tombs of Mycenae might be found within the citadel. However, Schliemann's letter of 10 March [O.S. 26 February] 1870 to Frank Calvert indicated that his petition had been unsuccessful. Further events in Greece, particularly the Dilessi murders of April, put paid to any prospect of an official permit that year, and Schliemann left Greece for Troy, where he excavated until 1873.

Throughout his time in Troy, Schliemann continued to push for permission to excavate in Greece. On 28 November [O.S. 16 November] 1872, he became a member of the Archaeological Society of Athens, and in January 1873 he made another petition, to Panagiotis Efstratiadis and to Dimitrios Kallifronas, the Minister for Ecclesiastical Affairs and Public Education, which was again refused. Further efforts to offer 'Treasure of Priam', excavated from Troy in May 1873, in exchange for permission, were similarly rebuffed. At first, he divided his attentions between Mycenae and Olympia, but the Greek government awarded the permit for Olympia to the German government early in 1874, to which Schliemann reacted in fury. Between 7 March [O.S. 23 February] and 16 March [O.S. 4 March] 1874, Schliemann travelled to Mycenae, hired workers and made an illegal excavation, digging 34 test trenches around the site and only stopping when forced to do so by the police, on Kallifronas's and Efstratiadis's orders.

In 1874, Dimitrios Voulgaris became Prime Minister for the eighth and final time. The new government, through Kallifronas's successor Ioannis Valassopoulos, gave Schliemann permission to excavate, but gave ultimate responsibility for the project to the Greek Archaeological Service under Efstratiadis. Efstratiadis in turn stipulated that Stamatakis should serve as supervisor to the project, responsible for ensuring that Schliemann followed the terms of his permit and that the interests of the Greek state in preserving the antiquities were respected. The archaeological historian Dora Vasilikou has suggested that the Voulgaris government's greater receptivity to Schliemann's work was a function of the high levels of corruption prevalent within it.

=== Schliemann's excavations of 1876 ===
"Mr Schliemann, from the very beginning of the excavations, has shown a tendency to destroy, against my wishes, everything Greek or Roman in order that only what he identifies as Pelasgian houses and tombs remain and be preserved. Whenever pottery sherds of the Greek and Roman period are uncovered, he treats them with disgust. If in the course of the work they fall into his hands, he throws them away. We, however, collect everything – what he calls Pelasgian, and Greek and Roman pieces."

— Stamatakis, August 1874.

On 2 August [O.S. 21 July] 1876, Valassopoulos confirmed Stamatakis as overseer of the excavation, and made clear that it was being treated as an operation of the Archaeological Society of Athens, for whom Schliemann was in effect working. Legal troubles prevented Schliemann from beginning the excavations until 9 August [O.S. 28 July].

Stamatakis kept a daily diary of the excavations, and supplemented this with regular reports to his superiors in the Greek government and the Archaeological Society. Among his major contributions to the excavations was establishing the system for classifying finds by material. More generally, he insisted on the meticulous recording of all finds, often clashing with Schliemann's desire to demolish anything that was not "Homeric", and οften slowed or stopped part of the work in order to ensure that finds, such as the relief of the Lion Gate, could be properly assessed and protected. While Schliemann only visited the site, at least at first, in the mornings and evenings, Stamatakis remained throughout the day, supervising the work, and it was he who took charge of the recording, sorting and processing of finds. His efforts and documentation have been credited with preserving the scientific integrity of the excavation, and preventing its descent into "gold-digging".

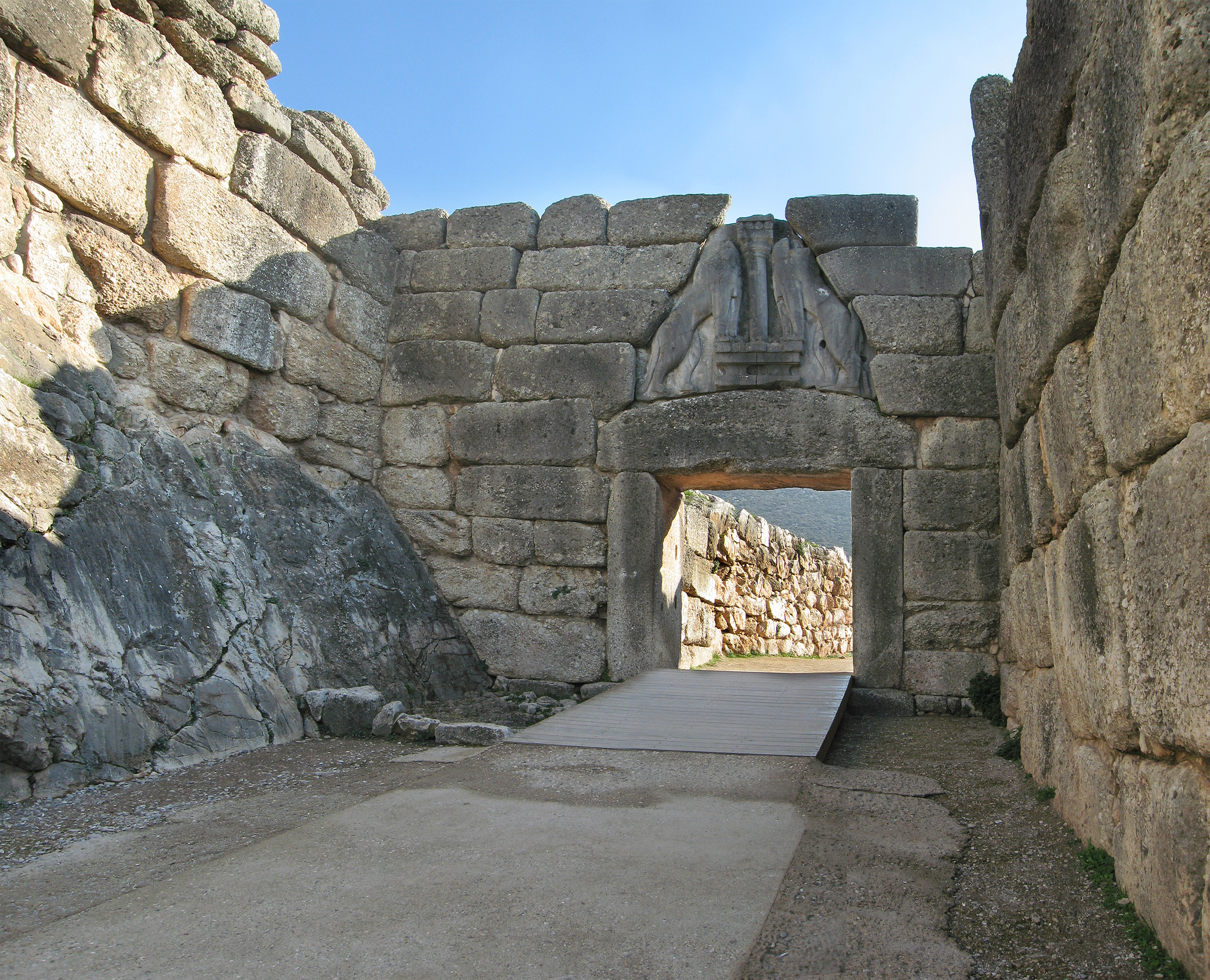
The Lion Gate at Mycenae, where Schliemann and Stamatakis began the excavations of 1876

Schliemann's initial excavations took place around the Lion Gate and, when Stamatakis insisted that he stop removing material from around the gate until its structural integrity could be assessed, the Tomb of Clytemnestra. On 8 September [O.S. 27 August], Stamatakis halted the excavations for three days, in protest at the difficulty of supervising Schliemann's rapidly-expanding workforce (now numbering seventy workers, versus thirty in July) and at Schliemann's attempts to remove finds, particularly stelae, from the site. Schliemann's behaviour, however, remained focused on completing the excavations as quickly as possible: he had expanded his workforce to a total of 125 workers by the time the stoppage concluded.

The excavation of Grave Circle A took place over eleven days. Schliemann discovered five shaft graves within the circuit, conventionally numbered with Roman numerals I–V. Schliemann's recording of this phase of the excavation has been described as having "serious scientific shortcomings, including the often vague and confusing information he provided on findspots." Schliemann gave no detailed account of the arrangements of the graves, and what details he did include were frequently incorrect, often adjusting the truth to fit a neater arrangement. Stamatakis, by contrast, maintained a detailed account of the position of each burial and the finds associated with it, and his rediscovered notebooks formed the basis of a major reassessment of the Grave Circle A burials in 2009. In contrast to Schliemann's emphasis on speedily recovering the finds, Stamatakis sought to analyse the material and its stratigraphy fully before removing it: he attempted, for instance, to study the position and emplacement of the stelae above the shaft graves, in order to test a hypothesis that they might have been fixed in the ground considerably later than the burials they marked. In the case of Grave I, Schliemann's failure to record the stratigraphy of the layers above the graves, born out of a desire to excavate as quickly as possible, has been blamed for the destruction of valuable information as to whether Mycenaean figurines, dated around four centuries later than the burials, might have been placed in the grave as offerings during the re-building of Grave Circle A in the Late Mycenaean period.

==== Relationship with Schliemann ====
"Mr Schliemann conducts the excavations as he wishes, paying no regard either to the law or to the instructions of the Ministry or to any official. Everywhere and at all times he prefers to look to his own advantage."

— Stamatakis, September 1874

The relationship between Stamatakis and Schliemann was strained. Schliemann referred to him only once in his 1878 publication of Mycenae, his own monograph on the site and excavations, as "a government clerk". In his letters, Schliemann called him "a government spy", and his wife Sophia Schliemann referred to him as "our enemy". In his own letters to his superiors in the Archaeological Society of Athens and the Greek Archaeological Service, Stamatakis twice threatened to resign. When ordered to stop digging or slow down the work, both Heinrich and Sophia could be aggressive: on one occasion, Stamatakis reported to Athens that Heinrich had begun "to insult [him] coarsely", and that Sophia had "abuse[d] [him] in front of the workers, saying that [he] was illiterate and fit only to conduct animals". By early October, Stamatakis and Schliemann were speaking only through intermediaries.

Schliemann left Mycenae on 16 December [O.S. 4 December] 1876: in a letter to Max Müller, he wrote that Stamatakis "would have made an excellent executioner", and professed his determination never to excavate in Greece again. Later, in 1877, he described him as "the brute delegate of the Greek government".

No securely-identified image of Stamatakis survives, and it has been suggested that Schliemann had him edited out of an illustration published in Mycenae as a consequence of their poor relationship. After Stamatakis's death, Schliemann referred to him in his monograph Tiryns as a "distinguished archaeologist".

=== Stamatakis's work at Mycenae after Schliemann's departure ===
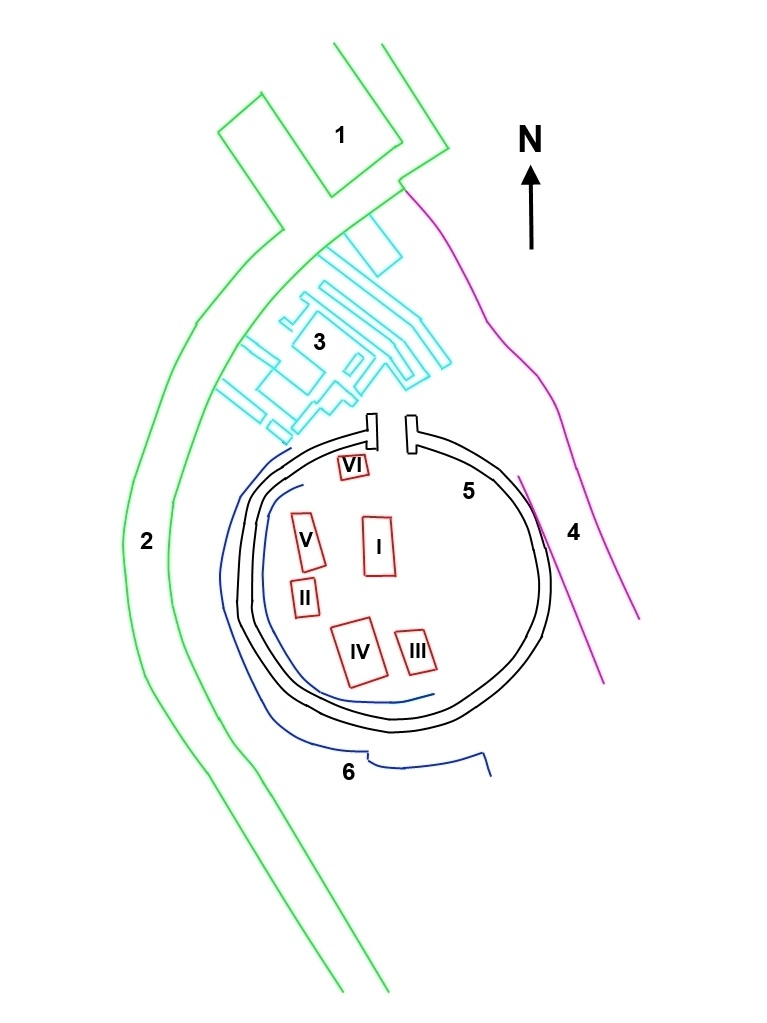
Plan of Grave Circle A. Grave VI, overlooked by Schliemann, was discovered and excavated by Stamatakis in November 1877.

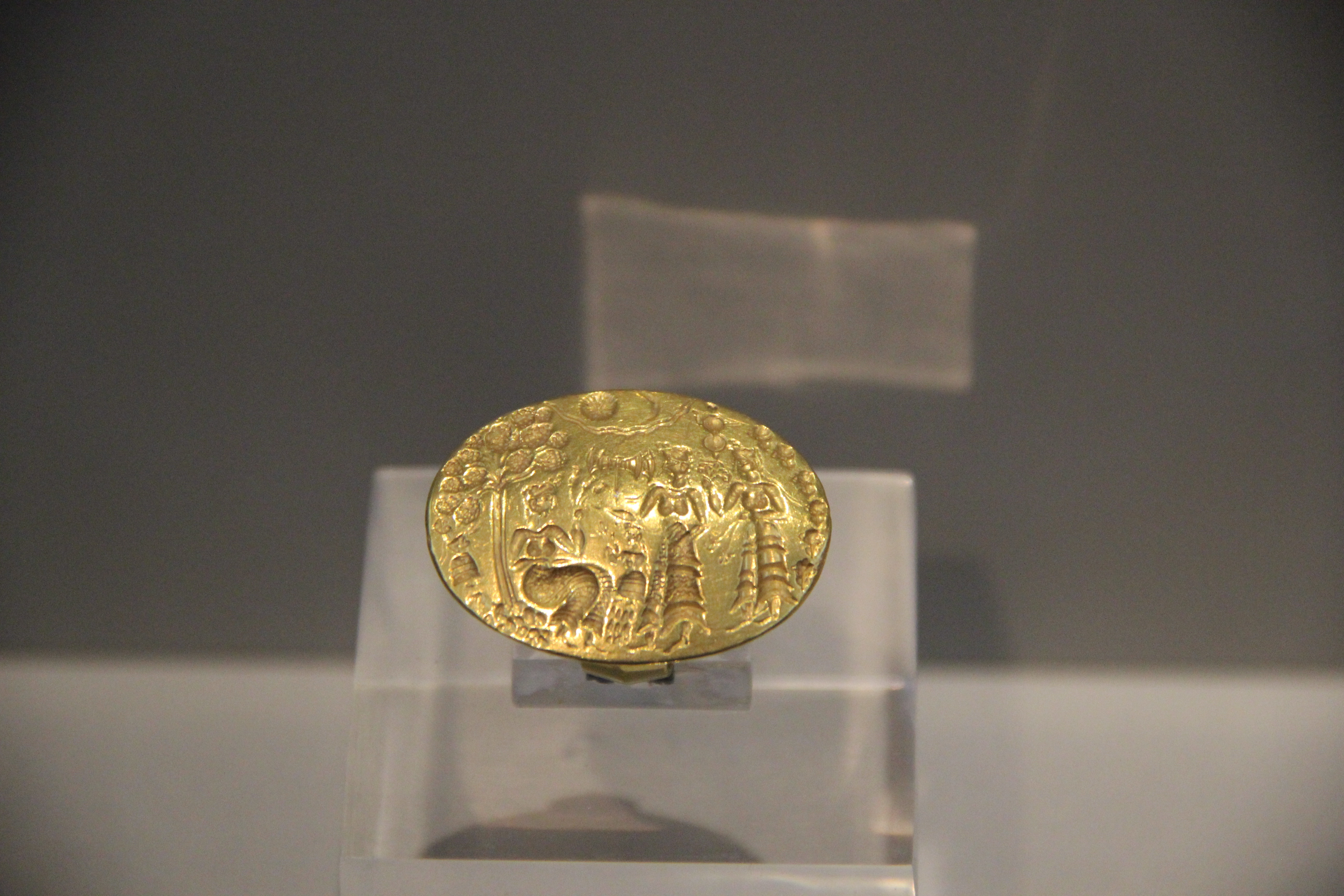
Signet ring excavated by Stamatakis in the so-called "Ramp House" at Mycenae, in January 1877, after Schliemann's departure

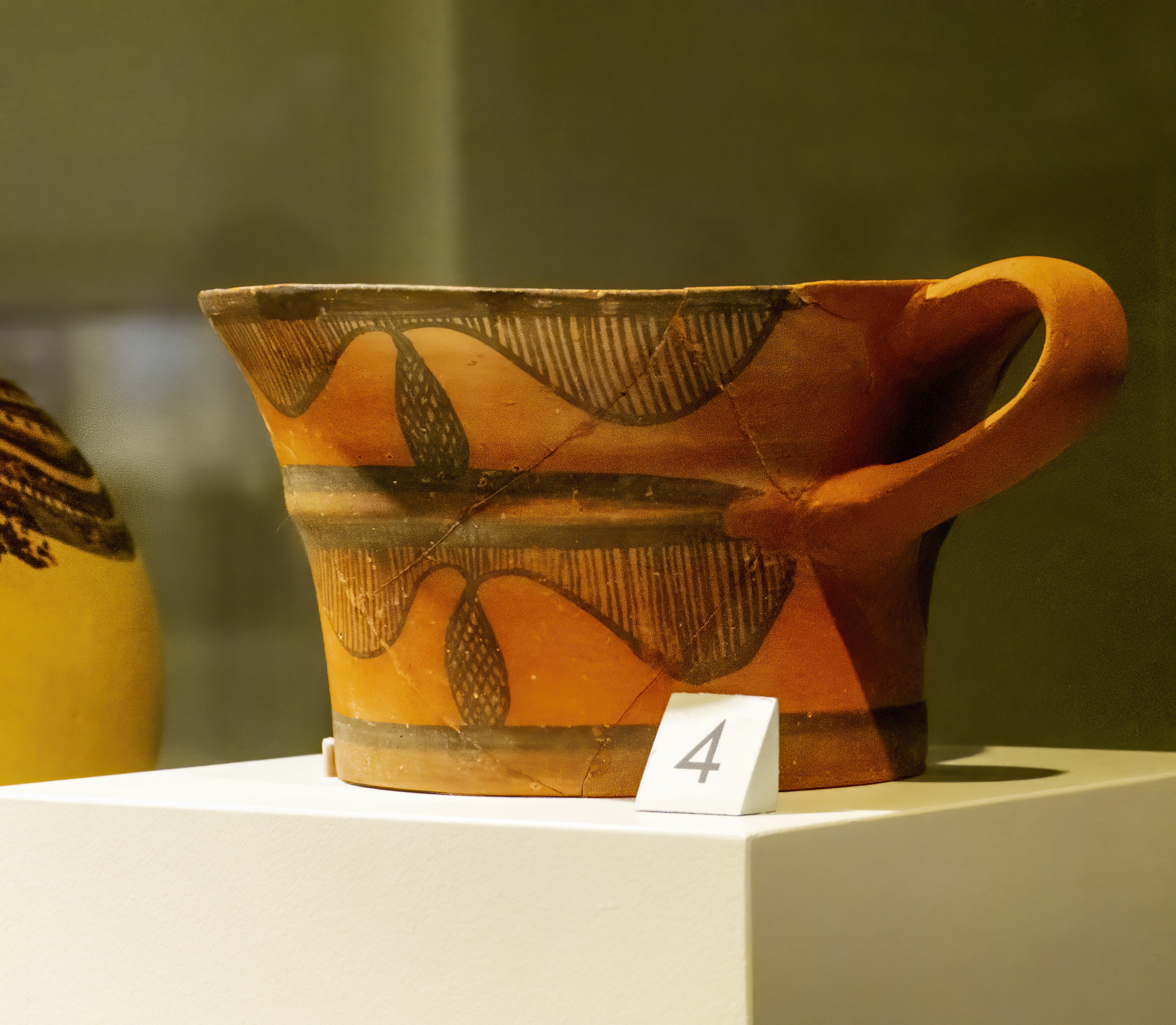
Pottery cup found in Grave VI of Circle A at Mycenae, 16th century BCE

Schliemann left many finds partially exposed in the ground, and several trenches unfinished. Stamatakis returned to Mycenae early in January 1877. Following the observation of a trench to the south side of the Grave Circle, Stamatakis excavated and discovered, along with Vasilios Drosinos, Schliemann's surveyor, the remains of the so-called "Ramp House", including a treasury of gold vessels, jewellery and a signet ring. This assemblage, known as the "Acropolis Treasure", has been interpreted as the contents of a looted shaft grave. Much of its material was imported, showing connections between Mycenae and Central Europe. Another major project undertaken by Stamatakis in this period was the systematic photography of the finds and remains at Mycenae.

Stamatakis would continue working at the site until January 1878, aiming both to head off any possibility of looting and to ensure that Schliemann's excavations were properly finished. He was also responsible in this period for the safe transportation of the antiquities found at Mycenae to Athens, where they were stored, against Schliemann's protests, in the basement of the National Bank. At the end of December, it was agreed that they would be moved to a new display in the Polytechneion, which Stamatakis arranged, ordering the finds according to the burials with which they were discovered.

In June 1877, Stamatakis excavated two Mycenaean chamber tombs at Spata near Athens. On 13 November [O.S. 1 November], he returned to Mycenae, and began excavating on 21 November [O.S. 9 November]: within ten days, a sixth Shaft Grave (numbered as VI), containing two burials, was discovered near the entrance to the Grave Circle, and Stamatakis excavated it on that day. In December, he uncovered four further cist graves towards the outside of the Grave Circle.

== After Mycenae ==
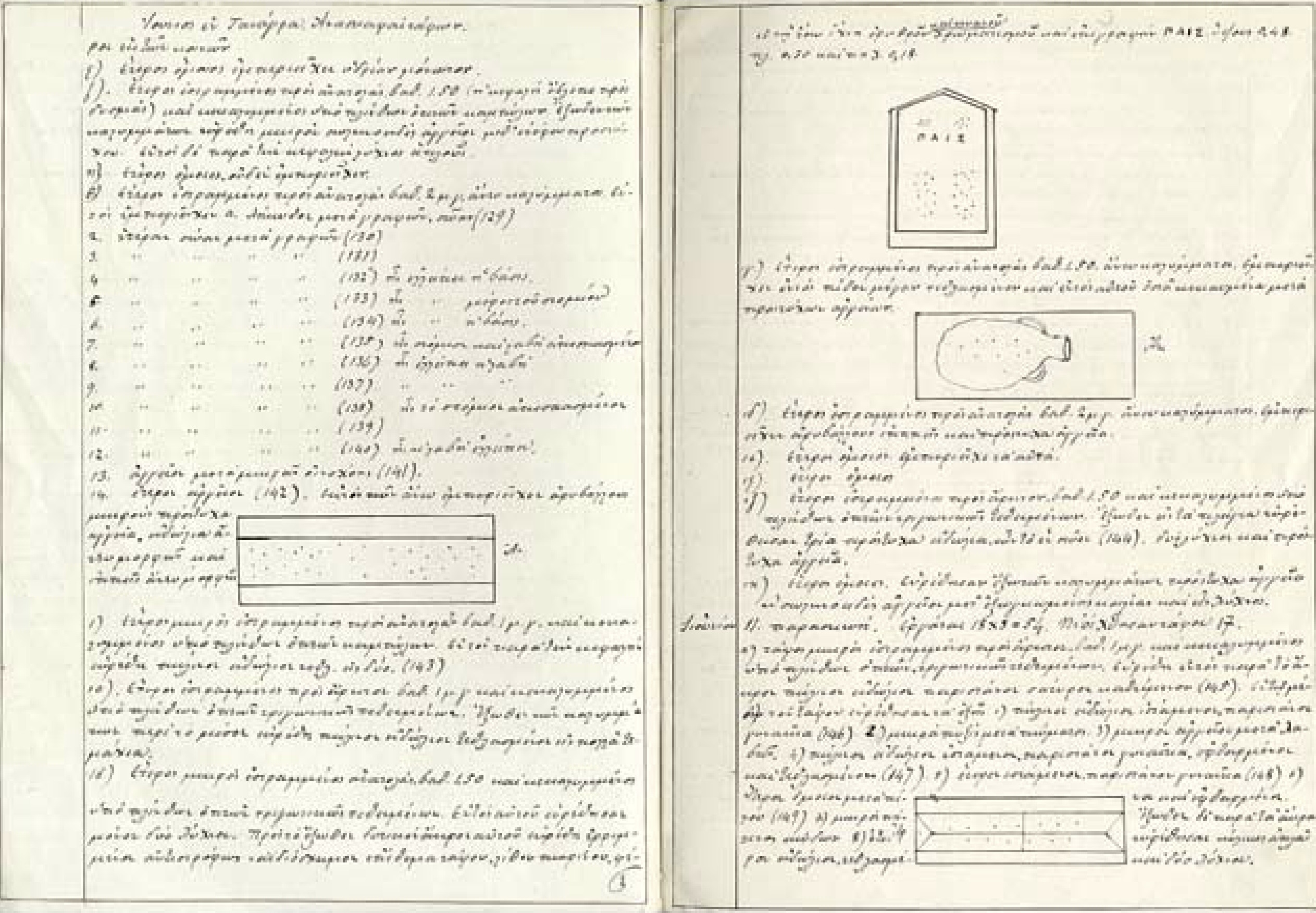
A page from Stamatakis's archaeological daybook, kept during his excavations at Tanagra in 1876

In 1880, Stamatakis excavated the burial mound of the Theban "Sacred Band" on the battlefield of Chaeronea, and in 1882 he began the excavation of the collective tomb (polyandrion) of the Thespian warriors who died at the Battle of Delium in 424 BCE. Most of his archaeological work remained unpublished at the time of his death: he also carried out excavations at Delphi, Phthiotis and throughout Greece.

In 1881, he is said to have carried out the clearing of a well on the acropolis of Daulis in Phocis, uncovering a number of Classical vase fragments. In 1882, he invited the future archaeologist Christos Tsountas, then aged 25, to accompany him on a tour of Boeotia, combatting the illicit trade in antiquities – an event which has been described as the beginning of Tsountas's apprenticeship to Stamatakis. In 1883, Stamatakis excavated in Thespiai, uncovering 150 stone blocks which he took to be the seats from the city's theatre.

In 1884, on the retirement of Efstratiadis, Stamatakis was promoted to Ephor General. (Note: Archaeological Society of Athens 2019; Petrakos 2022, p. 31 (for the place of death).) He lived in Piraeus, southwest of Athens, though his residence is uncertain: it may have been in the Maniatika area. He died less than a year later, on 31 March [O.S. 19 March] 1885, of malaria in Piraeus. (Note: Archaeological Society of Athens 2019; Petrakos 2022, p. 31 (for the place of death).) Contemporary newspapers reported that he had contracted the disease during his excavations at Chaeronea, and he had certainly suffered from it for several years. The university professor and education reformer Minos Lappas gave the eulogy at his funeral. Stamatakis was buried in the First Cemetery of Athens, in a tomb whose headstone was designed by Wilhelm Dörpfeld, a German architect and archaeologist who had assisted Schliemann with his excavations at Troy. Some time afterwards, however, the tomb was demolished, apparently because Stamatakis lacked any living descendants to whom ownership of it could be passed. However, the historians Vyron Antoniadis and Anna Kouremenos have noted that several surviving 19th-century graves in the First Cemetery belong to people without living heirs, and suggested on that basis that "the municipality of Athens considered the grave to be rather unimportant".

== Bibliography ==
- Antoniadis, Vyron; Kouremenos, Anna (2021). "Selective Memory and the Legacy of Archaeological Figures in Contemporary Athens: The Case of Heinrich Schliemann and Panagiotis Stamatakis". The Historical Review/La Revue Historique. 17: 181–204. doi:10.12681/hr.27071. hdl:10442/18299. S2CID 238067293.
- Antonaccio, Carla (1992). "Terraces, Tombs, and the Early Argive Heraion". Hesperia. 61 (1): 85–105. doi:10.2307/148184. JSTOR 148184.
- Archaeological Museum of Thebes (2016). "The Scientific Work". Archived from the original on 2022-12-04.
- Archaeological Society of Athens (2019). "Stamatakis Panagiotis". Archived from the original on 27 January 2019.
- Archaeological Society of Athens (2022). Παναγιώτης Α. Σταματάκης: βίος και έργο [Panagiotis A. Stamatakis: Life and Work] (in Greek).
- Dickinson, O. T. P. K.; Papazoglou-Manioudaki, Lena; Nafplioti, Argyro; Prag, A. J. N. W. (2012). "Mycenae Revisited Part 4: Assessing the New Data". The Annual of the British School at Athens. 107: 161–188. doi:10.1017/S0068245412000056. JSTOR 41721882. S2CID 162150714.
- Dickinson, O. T. P. K. (1976). "Schliemann and the Shaft Graves". Greece and Rome. 23 (2): 159–168. doi:10.1017/S0017383500019161. JSTOR 642224. S2CID 162408938.
- French, Elizabeth (2013) [2002]. Mycenae: Agamemnon's Capital. Stroud: The History Press. ISBN 978-0-7524-1951-0.
- Galanakis, Yannis; Nowak-Kemp, Malgosia (2013). "Ancient Greek Skulls in the Oxford University Museum, Part II: The Rhousopoulos-Rolleston Correspondence". Journal of the History of Collections. 25 (1): 1–17. doi:10.1093/jhc/fhq040.
- Galanakis, Yannis (2011). "An Unpublished Stirrup Jar from Athens and the 1871–2 Private Excavations in the Outer Kerameikos". Annual of the British School at Athens. 106: 167–200. doi:10.1017/S0068245411000074. JSTOR 41721707. S2CID 162544324.
- Gallou, Chrysanthi (2019). Death in Mycenaean Laconia: A Silent Place. Oxford: Oxbow Books. ISBN 978-1-78925-245-3.
- Kiminas, Demetrius (2009). The Ecumenical Patriarchate. San Bernardino: The Borgo Press. ISBN 978-1-4344-5876-6.
- Konstantinidi-Syvridi, Eleni; Paschalidis, Constantinos (2019). "The Unacknowledged Panayotis Stamatakis and His Invaluable Contribution to the Understanding of Grave Circle A at Mycenae". Archaeological Reports (65): 111–126. JSTOR 26867451.
- Konstantinidi-Syvridi, Eleni (2020). "Panagiotis Stamatakis: 'Valuing the Ancient Monuments of Greece as Sacred Wealth...'". In Lagogianni-Georgakarakos, Maria; Koutsogiannis, Thodoris (eds.). These Are What We Fought For: Antiquities and the Greek War of Independence. Athens: Archaeological Resources Fund. pp. 276–289. ISBN 978-960-386-441-7.
- Marchand, Fabienne (2011). "A New Profession in a Funerary Inscription from Tanagra". Zeitschrift für Papyrologie und Epigraphik. 178: 207–209.
- Masouridi, Stavroula (2013). 1863–1885: Περίοδος Π. Ευστρατιάδη και Π. Σταματάκη [1863–1885: Period of P. Efstratiatis and P. Stamatakis]. In Kontouri, Elena; Masouridi, Stavroula (eds.). Ιστορίες επί χάρτου: Μορφές και θέματα της Αρχαιολογίας στην Ελλάδα του 19ου αιώνα [Histories on Paper: Modalities and Themes of Archaeology in Greece in the Nineteenth Century] (PDF) (in Greek). Athens: Ministry of Culture and Sport. pp. 22–27. ISBN 978-960-386-138-6. Archived from the original (PDF) on 2023-05-22.
- Moorehead, Caroline (2016). Priam's Gold: Schliemann and the Lost Treasures of Troy. London: Tauris Parke Paperbacks. ISBN 978-1-78453-487-5.
- Petrakos, Vasileios (2005). Η λεηλασία της Τανάγρας και ο Παναγιώτης Σταματάκης [The Looting of Tanagra and Panagiotis Stamatakis]. Mentor (in Greek). 76: 141–150.
- Petrakos, Vasileios (2007). "The Stages of Greek Archaeology". In Valavanis, Panos (ed.). Great Moments in Greek Archaeology. Athens: Kapon Press. pp. 16–35.
- Petrakos, Vasileios (2011). Η εν Αθήναις Αρχαιολογική Εταιρεία. Οι Αρχαιολόγοι και οι Ανασκαφές 1837–2011 (Κατάλογος Εκθέσεως) [The Archaeological Society of Athens: The Archaeologists and the Excavations 1837–2011 (Exhibition Catalogue)] (in Greek). Athens: Archaeological Society of Athens.
- Petrakos, Vasileios (2022). Παναγιώτης Α. Σταματάκης: βίος και έργο [Panagiotis A. Stamatakis: Life and Work]. Library of the Archaeological Society of Athens (in Greek). Vol. 343. Athens: Archaeological Society of Athens.
- Prag, A. J. N. W.; Papazoglou-Manioudaki, Lena; Neave, R. A. H.; Smith, Denise; Musgrave, J.H.; Nafplioti, A. (2009). "Mycenae Revisited, Part 1: The Human Remains from Grave Circle A: Stamatakis, Schliemann and Two New Faces from Shaft Grave VI". The Annual of the British School at Athens. 104: 233–277. doi:10.1017/S0068245400000241. JSTOR 20745367. S2CID 161384796.
- Raftopoulou, Stella (1998). "New Finds from Sparta". British School at Athens Studies. 4: 125–140. JSTOR 40960265.
- Schliemann, Heinrich (1886). Tiryns. London: John Murray. OCLC 1097086955.
- Snodgrass, Anthony (2016). "Thespiai and the Fourth- Century Climax in Boiotia". In Gartland, Samuel D. (ed.). Boiotia in the Fourth Century BC. Philadelphia: University of Pennsylvania Press. pp. 9–31. ISBN 978-0-8122-4880-7.
- Traill, David (1989). "The Archaeological Career of Sophia Schliemann". Antichthon. 23: 99–107. doi:10.1017/S0066477400003725. S2CID 148137252.
- Traill, David (2012). "Schliemann's Mycenae Excavations Through the Eyes of Stamatakis". In Korres, George Styl; Karadimas, Nektarios; Flouda, George (eds.). Archaeology and Heinrich Schliemann. A Century after his Death. Αssessments and Prospects. Myth – History – Science (PDF). Athens. pp. 79–84. ISBN 978-960-93-3929-2.
- Tufano, Salvatore (2023). Epaminonda di Tebe: Vita e sconfitte di un politico di successo [Epameinondas of Thebes: Life and Defeat of a Successful Politician] (PDF) (in Italian). Milan: Edizione Universitarie di Lettere Economia Diritto. ISBN 978-88-5513-100-1.
- Wace, Alan J. B.; Thompson, Maurice Scott (1912). Prehistoric Thessaly: Being Some Account of Recent Excavations and Explorations in North-Eastern Greece from Lake Kopais to the Borders of Macedonia. Cambridge: Cambridge University Press.
- Vasilikou, Dora (2006). Οι ανασκαφές της Αρχαιολογικής Εταιρείας στις Κυκλάδες 1872–1910 [The Excavations of the Archaeological Society in the Cyclades, 1872–1910] (in Greek). Athens: Archaeological Society of Athens. OL 49829473M.
- Vasilikou, Dora (2011). Το χρονικό της ανασκαφής των Μυκηνών, 1870–1878 [The Chronology of the Excavation of Mycenae, 1870–1878] (PDF). Athens: Archaeological Society of Athens. ISBN 978-960-8145-87-0.
- Zachariou, Maria (2013). Looking at the Past of Greece through the Eyes of Greeks (M.A.). University of Virginia.

Preceded by Panagiotis Efstratiadis	Ephor-General of Antiquities; 1884–1885	Succeeded by Panagiotis Kavvadias
