= Thourion =

Thourion may refer to:

- Mount Thourion, a mountain in ancient central Greece
- Thourion (Acarnania), a city in ancient Acarnania, in northwestern Greece
