= Classical archaeology =

Sub-discipline of archaeology

Classical archaeology is the archaeological investigation of the Mediterranean civilizations of Ancient Greece and Ancient Rome. Nineteenth-century archaeologists such as Heinrich Schliemann were drawn to study the societies they had read about in Latin and Greek texts. Many universities and foreign nations maintain excavation programs and schools in the area – such is the enduring appeal of the region's archaeology.

== Cultures discussed ==
Classical archaeology in its strictest, most traditional sense applies only to the study of Classical Athenian culture and the culture of the Roman Republic and Empire. However, over the course of the last century, the field has expanded to include discussions of the elaborate mosaic of cultures that produced the civilizations of Ancient Greece and Rome. Classical archaeologists interested in Greece frequently discuss Crete and the Minoan civilization present on that island during the Bronze Age. They also discuss the Helladic and Geometric periods, as well as occasionally discussing the Neolithic period as it pertains to Greece. Even during the Classical period, it is completely untrue to say that Greece had one true culture – a great deal of regional variation was present, and much of the study of Greek archaeology lies in examination of these regional differences. Greek archaeology covers the Hellenistic period as well, frequently compelling the classical archaeologist to examine the Greek influences present in all the areas that were part of Alexander the Great's empire, including much of the Middle East and Egypt.

Classical archaeologists interested in Roman civilization discuss the influence of the Etruscans and other early cultures present on the Italic Peninsula. They also discuss the subcultures present within the Roman Republic and Empire based on regional differences, and any discussion of the later empire requires at least a partial segue into the Byzantine Empire.

== Excavations ==
While inspired by ancient texts and sometimes using them to interpret artifacts, classical archaeology would not exist without ancient artifacts. Though much of classical archaeology (like any kind of archaeology) is performed by scholars in their studies, the most vibrant and crucial parts of classical archaeology are the archaeological excavations, more commonly known as "digs". Excavation techniques at first were modelled after excavations in Egypt and the Near East and searched for large artifacts and walls without much care for the delicate remains that might have existed in the ground around these artifacts. Many of the earliest sites still cannot be dated in a satisfying manner because the stratigraphy, soil layers with embedded artifacts used to determine the age of a site, was completely stripped away. Early excavations also often failed to record the items they found in sufficient detail, making it difficult to date artifacts, determine precisely where they were found, or establish a connection between objects that may have been found together. Over time, excavation techniques have greatly improved and the amount of information gleaned from each excavation is exponentially greater than that recorded in early excavations. While excavation reports now take many years to compile due to the level of detail included and analyzed.

== Roman archaeology ==
The discipline of Roman archaeology, when understood as the study of the Roman provinces, their specific cultures, and the processes of Romanisation, is commonly integrated into departments of classical archaeology or, at least, closely associated with them. Its focus is generally geographical, centering on local sites and regional material customs in their broader provincial contexts. More frequently, the study of provincial Roman art is situated within the domain of art history.

Comparable institutional and research trajectories can also be observed in Byzantine and Christian archaeology where these fields are closely related to classical archaeology, when situated outside of theological or medieval chairs.
