= Chaeronea =

Village in Boeotia, Greece

Chaeronea Χαιρώνεια
- Municipal unit
- Location within the regional unit

- Location within Greece
- Coordinates: 38°29′42″N 22°50′51″E
- Country: Greece
- Administrative region: Central Greece
- Regional unit: Boeotia
- Municipality: Livadeia

Area
  - Municipal unit: 111.445 km^{2} (43.029 sq mi)
  - Community: 26.995 km^{2} (10.423 sq mi)
- Elevation: 130 m (430 ft)

Population (2021)
  - Municipal unit: 993
  - Municipal unit density: 8.91/km^{2} (23.1/sq mi)
  - Community: 421
  - Community density: 15.6/km^{2} (40.4/sq mi)
- Time zone: UTC+2 (EET)
  - Summer (DST): UTC+3 (EEST)
- Vehicle registration: ΒΙ

Chaeronea (/ˌkɛrəˈniːə/; Greek: Χαιρώνεια, Chaironeia [kʰai̯rɔ̌ːneːa]) is a village and a former municipality in Boeotia, Greece, located about 35 kilometers east of Delphi. The settlement was formerly known as Kópraina (Κόπραινα), and renamed to Chairóneia (Χαιρώνεια) in 1916. Since the 2011 local government reform it is part of the municipality Livadeia, of which it is a municipal unit. The municipal unit has an area of 111.445 km^{2}, the community is 26.995 km^{2}. Population 993 (2021). It is located near Mount Thourion in the Cephissus river valley, NW of Thebes.

== History ==
First settled in the Prehistoric period at the site now known as Magoula Balomenou (Μαγούλα Μπαλωμένου), its older name was Arne, and it was originally on the shore of Lake Copais (later drained).

=== Iron Age ===
Chaeronea was subject to Orchomenus which was, beginning in 600 BC, a member of the Boeotian League. In the late 5th century BC, Chaironeia belonged to one of the 11 Boeotian districts along with Acraephnium and Copia.

=== Classical Age ===
Chaeronea's importance lay in its strategic position near the head of the defile which presents the last serious obstacle to an invader in central Greece, and it was the site of several historical battles. The best known is that of 338 BC, between Philip II of Macedon and a coalition of various Greek states, mainly Thebes and Athens. According to Plutarch, during the battle the elite unit of Theban soldiers known as the Sacred Band of Thebes was wiped out completely. In 1818, the so-called Lion of Chaeronea, a nearly 6 m (20 ft) tall funerary monument erected in honor of the Sacred Band, was rediscovered by English travellers. The fragmentary monument was reassembled and installed in 1902 by an organisation called the Order of Chaeronea atop a pedestal at the site of its discovery. The site of the Theban mass grave was excavated in 1879–80 by Panagiotis Stamatakis, and the prehistoric site of Magoula Balamenou 23 years later by the archaeologist George Soteriadis.

The ancient biographer and essayist Plutarch was born in Chaeronea, and several times refers to these and other facts about his native place in his writings. Plutarch refers to many graves of Amazons near the stream of Haemon, and assumes that these were casualties during the Amazon journey back home after the conclusion of the Attic War. In his Parallel Lives, he mentions the Greek prophet Peripoltas.

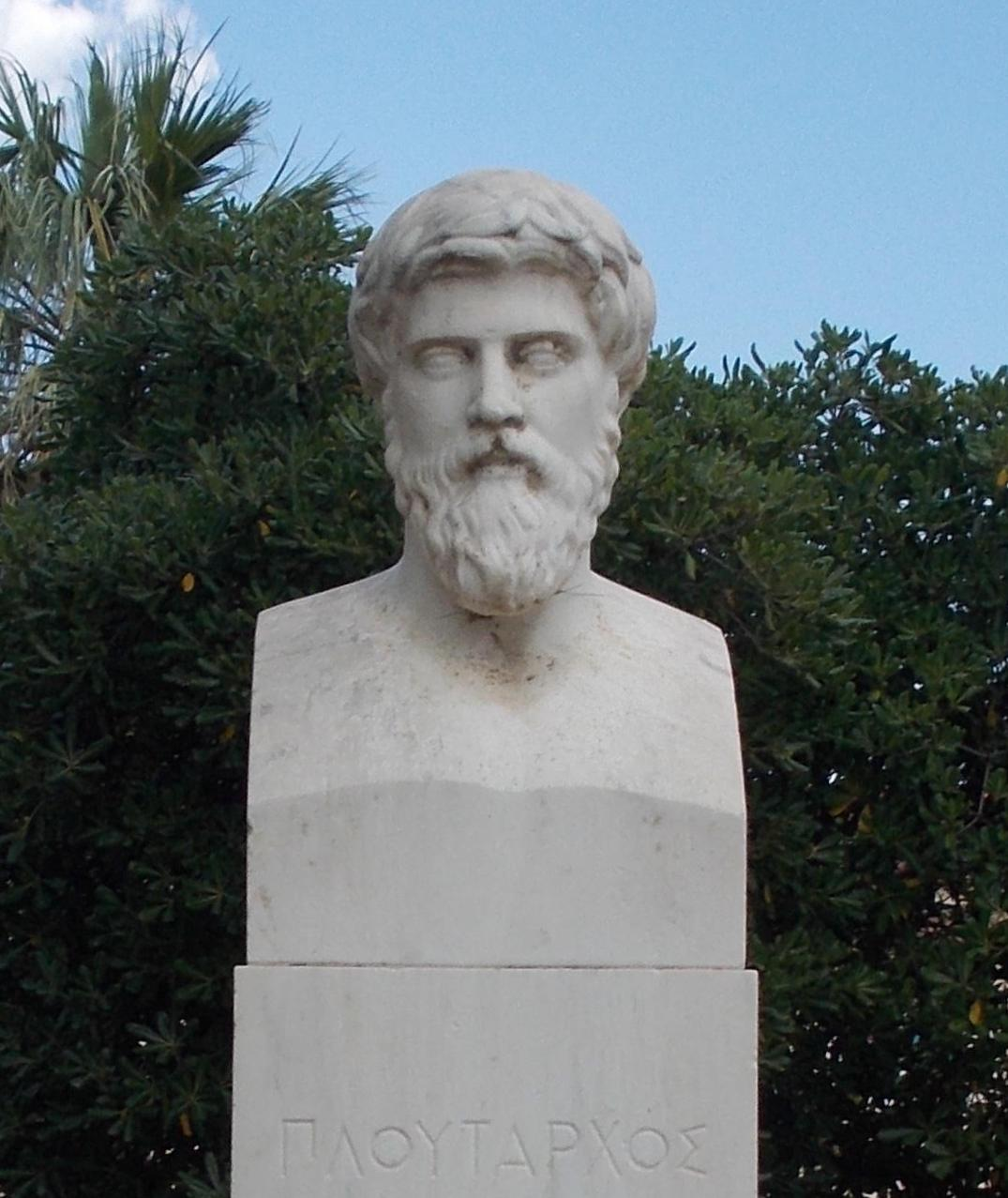
Plutarch's bust at Chaeronea

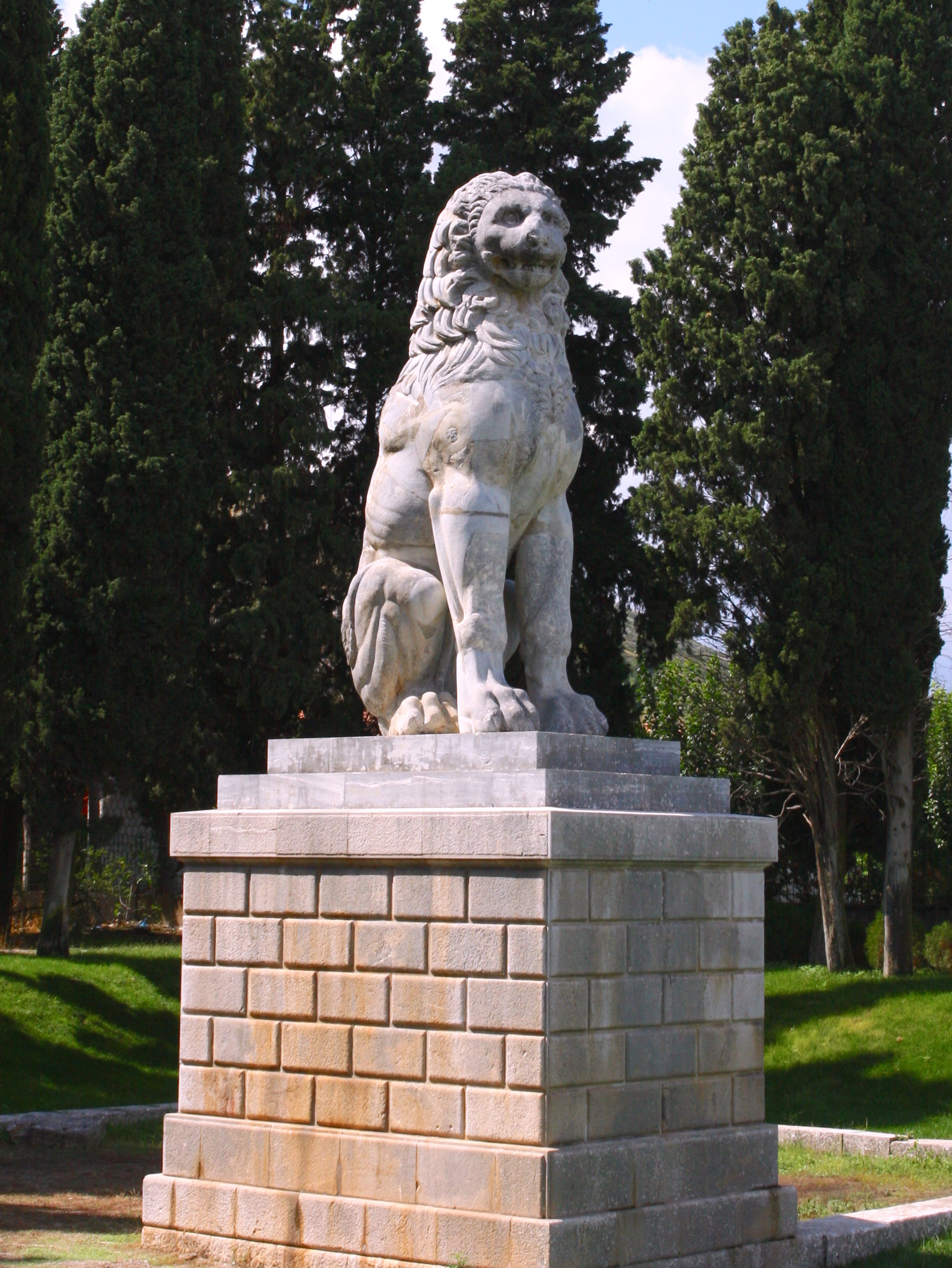
The Lion of Chaeronea

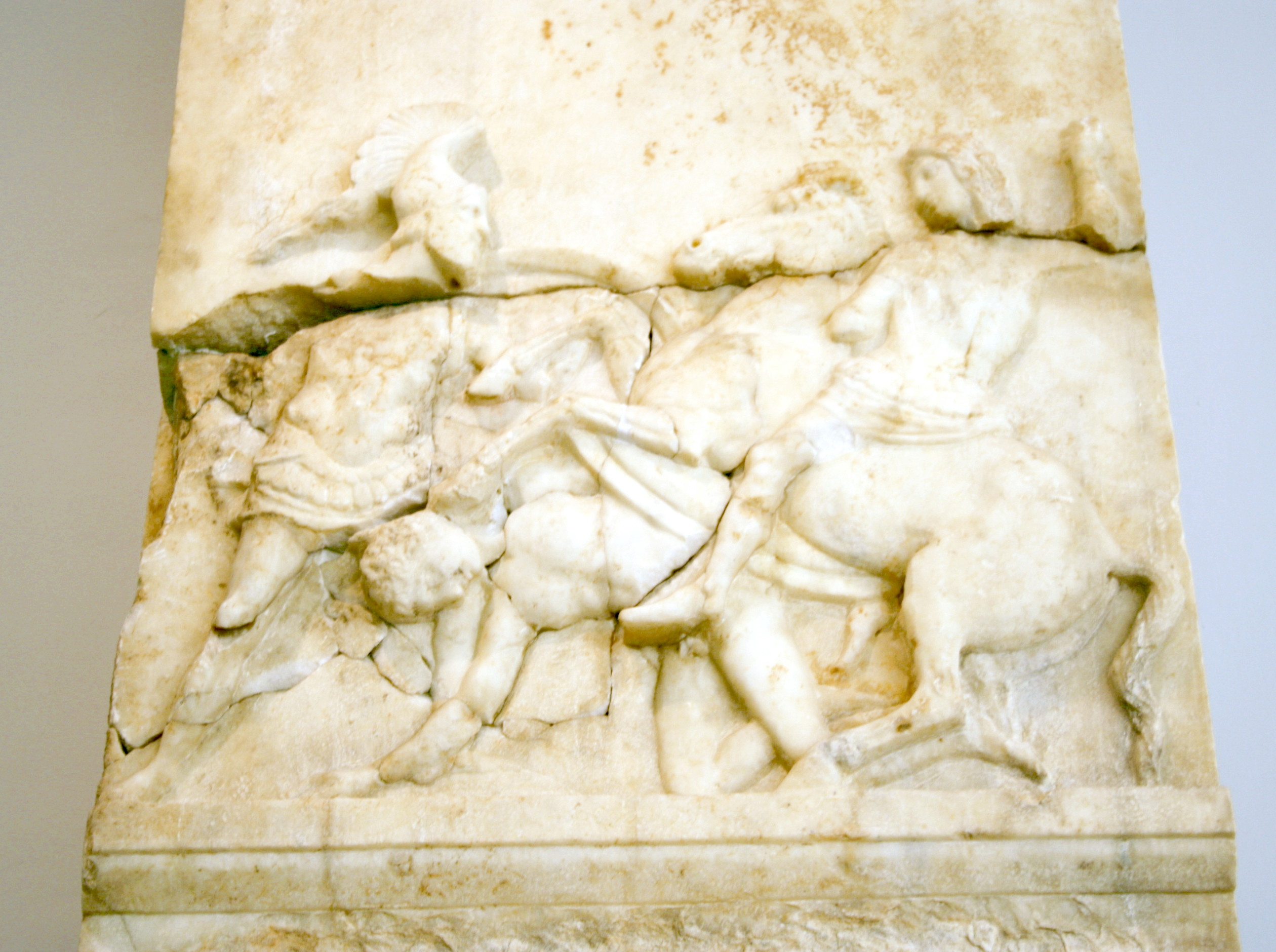
Funerary relief for Athenian footman Panchares, who probably fell at the battle of Chaeronea (338 BC)

=== Middle Ages ===
Chaeronea remained inhabited throughout Antiquity, and despite being devastated during the 551 Malian Gulf earthquake, probably remained in existence during the following centuries as well, as it is consistently attested among the cities of the Theme of Hellas. Remains of a three-aisled early Christian basilica, dedicated to Saint Paraskevi, survive.

After the Fourth Crusade and the foundation of the Crusader Duchy of Athens, a castle was built in the town, on the site of the ancient acropolis. This was part of an extensive defensive network along the Cephissus valley built by the Frankish Crusaders, and residence of its lord. In Frankish times, the town became known as Kapraina (Greek: Κάπραινα; Spanish: la Cabrena), a name first attested in 1381 and used until early modern times. The town came under Ottoman rule probably in 1460. Chaeronia returned to Greek rule after the War of Independence in 1829.

== Transport ==
The settlement is served by Chaeronea railway station, with local stopping services to Athens and Leianokladi.
