= Peripoltas =

Peripoltas is a Greek prophet mentioned in Plutarch's Parallel Lives. He accompanied the King Ofeltas and Ofeltas' subjects from Thessaly to Boeotia. His descendants were long held in esteem, and the main branch of his lineage was established in Chaeronea, which was the first city they occupied, expelling the barbarians from it.

Peripoltas, the prophet, having brought the king Opheltas, and those under his command, from Thessaly into Boeotia, left there a family, which flourished a long time after; the greatest part of them inhabiting Chaeronea, the first city out of which they expelled the barbarians. The descendants of this race, being men of bold attempts and warlike habits, exposed themselves to so many dangers, in the invasions of the Mede, and in battles against the Gauls, that at last they were almost wholly consumed.
