= Battle of Chaeronea =

A number of battles have been fought at or near Chaeronea in Boeotia:

- Battle of Coronea (394 BC), a Spartan victory in the Corinthian War
- Battle of Chaeronea (338 BC), the victory of Philip II of Macedon over an alliance of Greek city-states under Athens and Thebes
- Battle of Chaeronea (146 BC), victory of Quintus Caecilius Metellus Macedonicus over the Arcadians
- Battle of Chaeronea (86 BC), a Roman victory during the First Mithridatic War
- Battle of Chaeronea (1823), battle of the Greek War of Independence
- Battle of Chaeronea (1825), battle of the Greek War of Independence
