= 551 Malian Gulf earthquake =

The 551 Malian Gulf earthquake took place in the Spring of 551 in the vicinity of the Malian Gulf. It affected the cities of Echinus and Tarphe.

== Background ==
During the 4th century, an earthquake took place in the Gulf of Corinth. It caused thousands of deaths and reportedly damaged the cities of Chaeronea, Coroneia, Naupactus, and Patras. The city of Corinth itself was probably also damaged, though this in not directly stated in the primary sources.

According to the 6th-century historian Procopius, this earthquake created new chasms. They reportedly remained open and "formed steps". Transportation between the local settlements became more difficult, with Procopius reporting a requirement of many detours to reach one's destination. A similar deformation of the ground is mentioned by the 5th-century historian Evagrius Scholasticus. Based on their description, the event marked a fault break which extended to the surface of the ground.

== Main event ==
According to Procopius, in 551 the region of the Malian Gulf was shaken by a new earthquake. The earthquake was then followed by a seismic sea-wave (tsunami). There reportedly was a sudden "influx of the sea" in the gulf between the regions of Thessaly and Boeotia. The cities of Echinus and Tarphe were flooded by the tsunami, and were immediately "levelled".

Procopius reports that the islands of the Gulf became reachable to pedestrians, since the sea had abandoned them. But when the sea returned to its proper place, it left behind fish on the ground.

There is some doubt on whether Procopius was conflating two different earthquakes, one which took place in the Gulf of Corinth, and another in the Malian Gulf. The geophysicist August Heinrich Sieberg (20th century) considered this to have been a single earthquake, but geophysicist Angelos Galanopoulos (20th century) considered this a description of two earthquakes. The journal Annals of Geophysics considered the second option more likely, because a singular earthquake of that magnitude would have affected more cities.

This was likely the same earthquake which Procopius reported as causing a collapse in the fortifications of Thermopylae.

Procopius reports that the earthquake coincided in time with a military expedition of the general Narses against the Ostrogoths, dating the event to the final years of the Gothic War.

While Procopius connected this earthquake to pre-existing seismic faults, the journal Annals of Geophysics considered another possible cause for it. Submarine landslides within the Malian Gulf may have been triggered by the initial earthquake. The stability of the local slopes was apparently sufficiently disturbed to cause subsequent events, such slumping of the coasts.

== Surrounding events ==
The year 551 included several other earthquakes in the regions of Greece, Anatolia, and the Middle East. In the city of Botrys (modern Batroun) a natural harbour was reportedly created this year, due to the collapse of the mountain Lithoprosopos (modern Theoprosopon). The chronicler John Malalas (6th century) reports the destruction of many ships in the city's vicinity by a large wave, possibly another tsunami.

== Sources ==
- Antonopoulos, J. (1980), Data from investigation of seismic Sea waves events in the Eastern Mediterranean from 500 to 1000 A.D., Annals of Geophysics
