= Sophia Schliemann =

Wife of Heinrich Schliemann

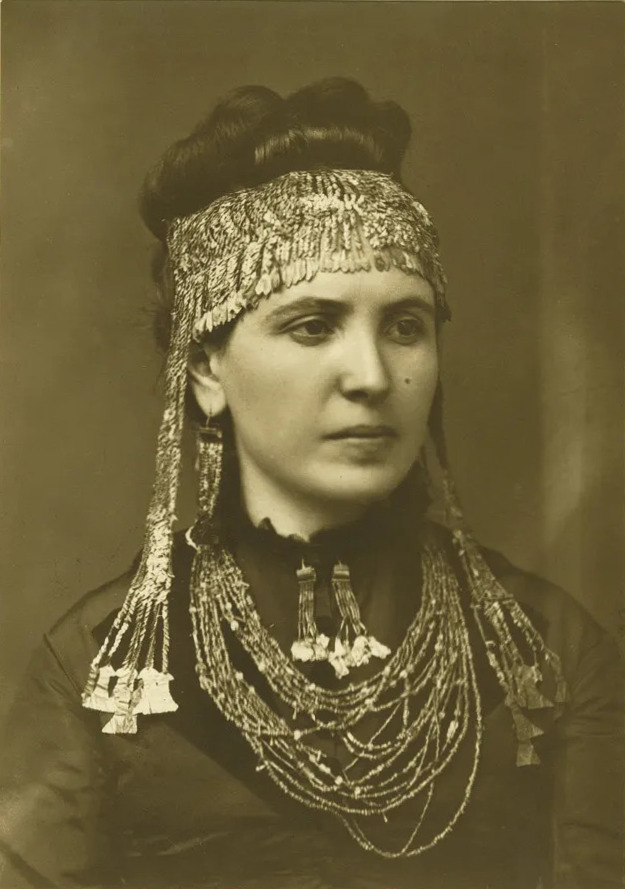
- Portrait of Schliemann wearing Priam's Treasure (1873)
- Born: Sophia Engastromenou; 12 January 1852; Athens, Greece
- Died: 27 October 1932 (aged 80); Athens, Greece
- Spouse: Heinrich Schliemann (m. 1869; died 1890)
- Children: 2 (incl. Agamemnon)

Sophia Schliemann, born Sophia Engastromenou (Σοφία Εγκαστρωμένου) (12 January 1852 – 28 October 1932) was the Greek second wife of the businessman and amateur archaeologist Heinrich Schliemann. She is known for posing for a photo while draped in gold jewelry from the Treasure of Priam.

== Life ==
Sofia Engastromenou was born in Athens to a wealthy mercantile family. Her father was a "well-known Greek banker who at one time was the largest individual shareholder of the Pennsylvania Railroad".

Her uncle, Bishop Theokletos Vimpos, was hired by 47-year-old Heinrich Schliemann to tutor him in Greek and later tasked with finding a "black-haired Greek woman in the Homeric spirit" to become his wife. Presented with photos of three women, Schliemann selected the seventeen-year-old Sofia. They were married on 24 September 1869, and would go on to have two children: Andromache (1871–1962) and Agamemnon (1878–1954).

Sophia was only briefly present during the 1873 excavations of Hisarlik, during which she was assaulted by a foreman. She departed the site after a month due to the unexpected death of her father. Schliemann later falsified the records to exaggerate Sophia's role in the excavations, and the story that the Treasure of Priam had been smuggled away from the site in Sophia's shawl.

After her husband's death in 1890 Sophia continued to give lectures on his work and hosted gatherings in her Athenian residence, the Iliou Melathron. She edited Schliemann's autobiography and published it in 1892.

Sophia spent the rest of her life as a member of Athenian high society and sponsor of charitable endeavors. In 1902, after witnessing the sufferings of Greek soldiers of the recent war with Turkey, she and a group of society ladies sponsored the construction of a sanatorium for tuberculosis patients in Goudi. She served on its board of directors from 1919 until her death in 1932.

The institution has since become the Sotiria Thoracic Disease Hospital, the largest pulmonary center in Greece.

Sophia died on 27 October 1932 at the age of 80, 13 days after suffering a heart attack. She was buried with state honors in the family tomb at the First Cemetery of Athens next to her husband, whom she outlived by 42 years.

== In literature and film ==
Sophia was a central character in Irving Stone's 1975 historical novel The Greek Treasure. In the 2007 German television film The Hunt for Troy, Sophia Engastromenou was portrayed by the French actress Mélanie Doutey. She inspired the 2013 novel Sophia: A Woman's Search for Troy by Nancy Joaquim.

== Writings ==
- Heinrich Schliemann; Sophia Schliemann (ed.): Heinrich Schliemann's Autobiography. Leipzig, 1892. (Online version)
