= Mount Thourion =

Conical hill in Ancient Greece

- Thurium Mons
- Location within Greece

Highest point
- Elevation: 188 m (617 ft)
- Coordinates: 38°30′0.91″N 22°49′28.05″E

Geography
- Location: Central Greece

Climbing
- First ascent: Antiquity
- Easiest route: Hike

Mount Thourion or Thurium Mons was the name of a conical hill in Ancient Greece. A temple to the cult of the Muses may have been situated here.

The location of the hill was gradually forgotten and was rediscovered in February 1990 by an archaeologist and four graduate students from the University of California, Berkeley. In Plutarch's “Life of Sulla”, the hill is noted as having been the site of a monument to two townsmen of Chaeronea named Homoloichos and Anaxidamos, for their assistance to Sulla during the Battle of Chaeronea. The two showed Sulla's troops a back way up Thourion, enabling them to surprise the invading Pontic soldiers.

In gratitude, a monument was erected on the summit with their names carved on it in Greek letters. The rediscovered monument was a marble block, about three feet wide and one foot high, inscribed with three words “HOMOLOICHOS,” “ANAXIDAMOS,” and “aristis” (Greek for heroes).

A site likely to be that of the temple of Apollo Thourios was also found.
