= Heinrich Schliemann =

German businessman and archaeologist (1822–1890)

- Schliemann in 1866
- Born: 6 January 1822; Neubukow, Mecklenburg-Schwerin, German Confederation
- Died: 26 December 1890 (aged 68); Naples, Kingdom of Italy
- Resting place: First Cemetery of Athens
- Spouses: Ekaterina Petrovna Lyschin (m. 1852; div. 1869) Sophia Schliemann (m. 1869)
- Children: 5 (3 w/ Lyschin, 2 w/ Schliemann, incl. Agamemnon)
- Scientific career
- Fields: Archaeology

Johann Ludwig Heinrich Julius Schliemann (German: [ˈʃliːman]; 6 January 1822 – 26 December 1890) was a German businessman and an influential archeologist. He was an advocate of the historicity of places mentioned in the works of Homer and an archaeological excavator of Hisarlık, now presumed to be the site of Troy, along with the Mycenaean sites Mycenae and Tiryns.

His work lent weight to the idea that Homer's Iliad reflects historical events. Schliemann's excavation of nine layers of archaeological remains has been criticized as destructive of significant historical artefacts, including the layer that is believed to be the Homeric Troy.

== Early life and education ==
Schliemann was born 6 January 1822, in Neubukow, Mecklenburg-Schwerin (part of the German Confederation) to Luise Therese Sophie Schliemann and Ernst Schliemann, a Lutheran minister. He was the fifth of nine children. The family moved to Ankershagen in summer 1823. Their second home houses the Heinrich Schliemann Museum today.

Heinrich's father was a poor pastor. His mother died in 1831, when Heinrich was nine years old, and his father sent Heinrich to live with his uncle Friedrich Schliemann, also a pastor. When he was eleven years old, his father paid for his enrollment in the Gymnasium (college preparatory secondary school) at Neustrelitz, but he had to leave it after three months. Heinrich's interest in history was initially encouraged by his father, who had schooled him in the tales of the Iliad and the Odyssey and had given him a copy of Ludwig Jerrer's Illustrated History of the World for Christmas in 1829. Schliemann claimed that at the age of 7 he had declared he would one day excavate the city of Troy.

Heinrich had to transfer to the Realschule (non-college preparatory secondary school) after his father was accused of embezzling church funds and took his exams in 1836. His family's poverty made a university education impossible. In his archaeological career, there was often a division between Schliemann and the educated professionals.

At age 14, after leaving Realschule, Heinrich became an apprentice at Herr Holtz's grocery in Fürstenberg. He later said that his passion for Homer was born when he heard a drunken miller reciting Homeric verses at the grocer's. He laboured for five years until he was forced to leave because he hurt his chest, lifting a heavy barrel and coughing up blood. In 1841, Schliemann moved to Hamburg and became a cabin boy on the Dorothea, a brig bound for Venezuela. After twelve days at sea, the ship foundered in a gale. The survivors washed up on the shores of the Netherlands. Schliemann became a messenger, office attendant, and later, a bookkeeper in Amsterdam.

== Career ==
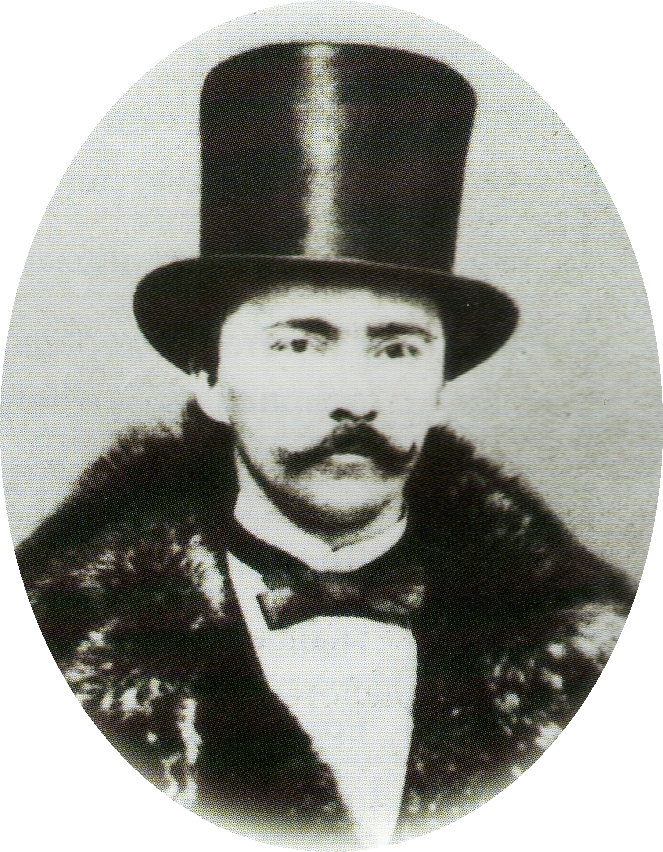
Schliemann as a young man

On 1 March 1844, 22-year-old Schliemann took a position with B. H. Schröder & Co., an import/export firm. In 1846, the firm sent him as a General Agent to St. Petersburg.

In time, Schliemann represented a number of companies. He learned Russian and Greek, employing a system that he used his entire life to learn languages; Schliemann claimed that it took him six weeks to learn a language and wrote his diary in the language of whatever country he happened to be in. By the end of his life, he could converse in English, French, Dutch, Spanish, Portuguese, Italian, Russian, Swedish, Polish, Greek, Latin, and Arabic, besides his native German.

Schliemann's ability with languages was an important part of his career as a businessman in the importing trade. In 1850, he learned of the death of his brother, Ludwig, who had become wealthy as a speculator in the California gold fields.

Schliemann went to California in early 1851 and started a bank in Sacramento buying and reselling over a million dollars' worth of gold dust in just six months. When the local Rothschild agent complained about short-weight consignments, he left California, feigning illness. While he was there, California became the 31st state in September 1850, and Schliemann acquired United States citizenship. Schliemann propounded this story in his autobiography of 1881, though he clearly was in St Petersburg that day, and "in actual fact, ...obtained his American citizenship only in 1869."

According to his memoirs, before arriving in California he dined in Washington, D.C., with President Millard Fillmore and his family, but W. Calder III says that Schliemann didn't attend but simply read about a similar gathering in the papers.

Schliemann also published what he said was an eyewitness account of the San Francisco Fire of 1851, which he said was in June although it took place in May. At the time he was in Sacramento and used the report of the fire in the Sacramento Daily Journal to write his report.

On 7 April 1852, he sold his business and returned to Russia. There he attempted to live the life of a gentleman, which brought him into contact with Ekaterina Petrovna Lyschin (1826–1896), the niece of one of his wealthy friends, whom he married on 12 October 1852. Schliemann next made a good profit trading in indigo dye.

By 1858, Schliemann was 36 years old and wealthy enough to retire. In his memoirs, he claimed that he wished to dedicate himself to finding the site of the ancient Troy.

== Amateur archaeologist ==
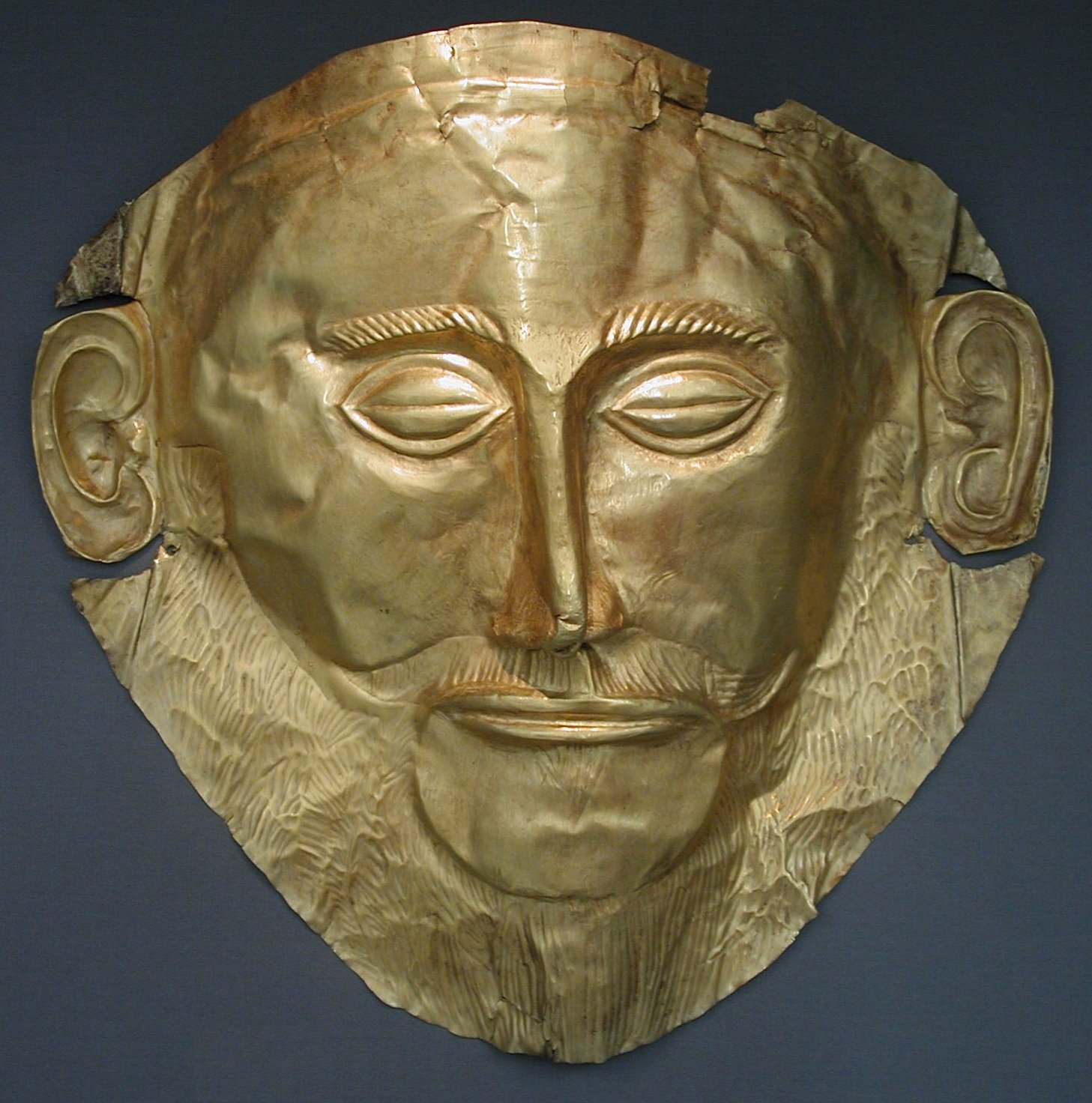
The 'Mask of Agamemnon', discovered by Heinrich Schliemann in 1876 at Mycenae now exhibited at the National Archaeological Museum of Athens.

Heinrich Schliemann was an amateur archaeologist. He was obsessed with the stories of Homer and ancient Mediterranean civilizations. He dedicated the second part of his life to unveiling the actual physical remains of the cities of Homer's epic tales. Many refer to him as the "father of pre-Hellenistic archaeology".

In 1868, Schliemann visited sites in the Greek world, and published his second book Ithaka, der Peloponnesus und Troja in which he described ancient sites in Greece and the Ottoman Empire and asserted that Hissarlik was the site of Troy. He submitted this book as a dissertation to the University of Rostock. In 1869, he was awarded a PhD in absentia from the university for that submission. David Traill claims that the examiners gave him his PhD on the basis of his topographical analyses of Ithaca, which were in part simply translations of another author's work or drawn from poetic descriptions by the same author. Other researchers who worked with documents from the university archives clearly contradict Traill's statements.

Schliemann was an honorary member of the Society of Antiquaries of London and elected a member of the American Antiquarian Society in 1880.

=== Troy and Mycenae ===
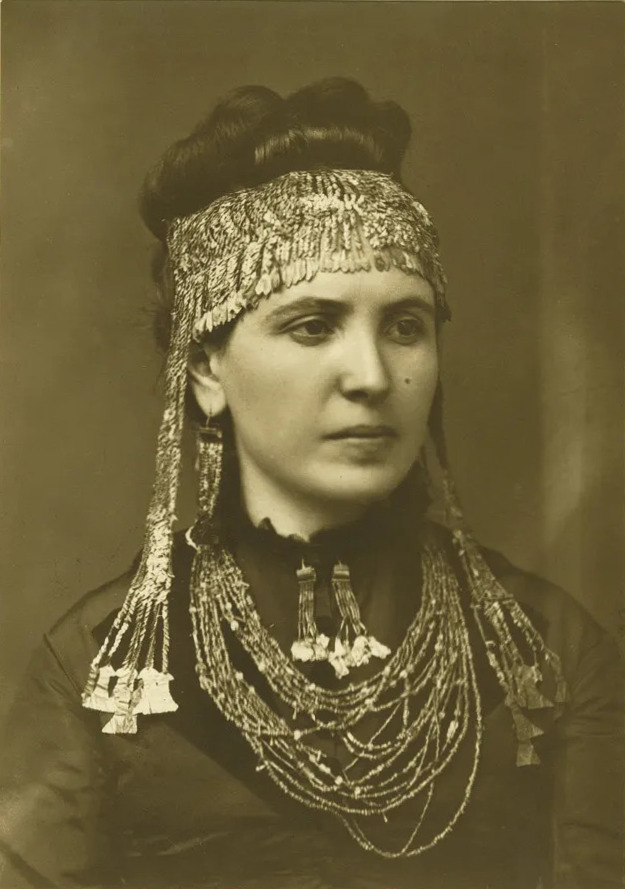
Sophia Schliemann (née Engastromenos) wearing finds recovered at Hisarlık

Schliemann's first interest of a classical nature seems to have been the location of Troy. At the time he began excavating in Turkey, the site commonly believed to be Troy was at Pınarbaşı, a hilltop at the south end of the Trojan Plain. The site had been previously excavated by English amateur archaeologist and local expert Frank Calvert. Schliemann performed soundings at Pınarbaşı but was disappointed by his findings. It was Calvert who identified Hissarlik as Troy and suggested Schliemann dig there on land owned by Calvert's family.

Schliemann was at first sceptical about the identification of Hissarlik with Troy but was persuaded by Calvert. In 1870, Schliemann began digging a trench at Hissarlik, and by 1873 had discovered nine buried cities.

Schliemann found pure copper and metal molds as well as a lot of other metal tools, cutlery, shields, and vases which were found at around 28 to 29 1/2 feet deep at the site.

The day before digging was to stop, 15 June 1873, Schliemann discovered gold, which he took to be Priam's Treasure trove. Recent research has confirmed several settlements on the site spanning 3,600 years. The layer that Schliemann referred to as "the Burnt City" and believed to be Troy is now thought to be from 3,000 to 2,000 BCE, too early to be the location of the Trojan War as Homer describes it.

He later wrote that he had seen the gold glinting in the dirt and dismissed the workmen so that he and his wife Sophia could excavate it themselves; they removed it in her shawl. However, Schliemann's oft-repeated story of the treasure being carried by Sophia in her shawl was untrue. Schliemann later admitted fabricating it; at the time of the discovery, Sophia was in fact with her family in Athens, following the death of her father.

Schliemann smuggled the treasure out of the Ottoman Empire into Greece. The Ottoman Empire sued Schliemann in a Greek court, and Schliemann was forced to pay a 10,000 gold. Schliemann ended up sending 50,000 gold francs to the Constantinople Imperial Museum, and got permission for further excavations at Hissarlik. In 1874 Schliemann published Troy and Its Remains. Schliemann at first offered his collections, which included Priam's Gold, to the Greek government, then the French, and finally the Russians. In 1881, his collections ended up in Berlin, housed first in the Ethnographic Museum, and then the Museum for Pre- and Early History, until the start of WWII. In 1939, all exhibits were packed and stored in the museum basement, then moved to the Prussian State Bank vault in January 1941. In 1941, the treasure was moved to the Flakturm located at the Berlin Zoological Garden, called the Zoo Tower. Dr. Wilhelm Unverzagt protected the three crates containing the Trojan gold when the Battle of Berlin commenced, right up until SMERSH forces took control of the tower on 1 May. On 26 May 1945, Soviet forces, led by Lt. Gen. Nikolai Antipenko, Andre Konstantinov, deputy head of the Arts Committee, Viktor Lazarev, and Serafim Druzhinin, took the three crates away on trucks. The crates were then flown to Moscow on 30 June 1945, and taken to the Pushkin Museum ten days later. In 1994, the museum admitted the collection was in their possession.

In 1876, he began digging at Mycenae, under the supervision of Panagiotis Stamatakis, a Greek archaeologist attached to the excavation as a condition of Schliemann's permit. There, he discovered the Shaft Graves, with their skeletons and more regal gold, including the so-called Mask of Agamemnon. These findings were published in Mycenae in 1878.

Although he had received permission in 1876 to continue excavation, Schliemann did not reopen the dig site at Troy until 1878–1879, after another excavation in Ithaca designed to locate a site mentioned in the Odyssey. Emile Burnouf and Rudolf Virchow joined him there in 1879.

In 1880 Schliemann began excavation of the Treasury of Minyas at Orchomenus (Boeotia).

From 1882 to 1883 Schliemann made a sixth excavation at Troy, in 1884 an excavation of Tiryns with Wilhelm Dörpfeld, and from 1889 to 1890 a seventh and eighth excavation at Troy, also with Dörpfeld.

== Personal life ==
After learning that his childhood sweetheart Minna had married, Schliemann married Ekaterina Petrovna Lyschin (1826–1896) on 12 October 1852. She was the niece of one of his wealthy friends in St Petersburg and they had three children; a son, Sergey (1855–1941), and two daughters, Natalya (1859–1869) and Nadezhda (1861–1935). As a consequence of his many travels, Schliemann was often separated from his wife and children. He spent a month studying at the Sorbonne in 1866 while moving his assets from St. Petersburg to Paris to invest in real estate. He asked his wife to join him, but she refused.

Schliemann threatened to divorce Ekaterina twice before doing so. In 1869, he bought property and settled in Indianapolis for about three months to take advantage of Indiana's liberal divorce laws, although he obtained the divorce by lying about his residency in the U.S. and his intention to remain in the state. He moved to Athens as soon as an Indiana court granted him the divorce and married again two months later.

A former teacher and Athenian friend, Theokletos Vimpos, the Archbishop of Mantineia and Kynouria, helped Schliemann find someone "enthusiastic about Homer and about a rebirth of my beloved Greece...with a Greek name and a soul impassioned for learning." The archbishop suggested the 17-year-old Sophia Engastromenos, daughter of his cousin. They were married by the archbishop on 23 September 1869. They later had two children, Andromache and Agamemnon Schliemann.

== Death ==
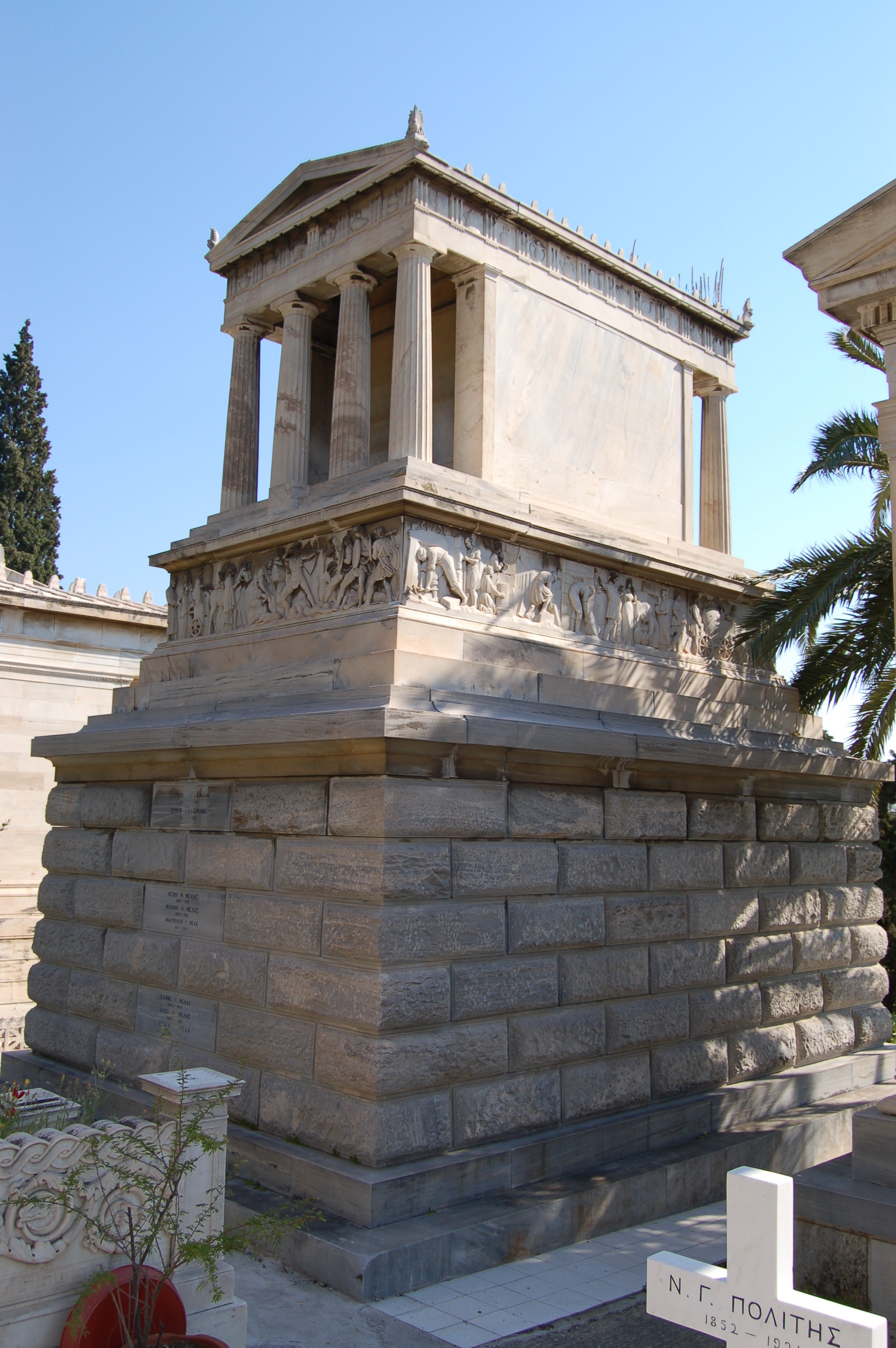
Schliemann's grave in the First Cemetery of Athens

On 1 August 1890, Schliemann returned reluctantly to Athens, and in November travelled to Halle, where his chronic ear infection was operated upon, on 13 November. The doctors deemed the operation a success, but his inner ear became painfully inflamed. Ignoring his doctors' advice, he left the hospital and travelled to Leipzig, Berlin and Paris. From the last, he planned to return to Athens in time for Christmas, but his ear condition became even worse. Too sick to make the boat ride from Naples to Greece, Schliemann remained in Naples but managed to make a journey to the ruins of Pompeii. On Christmas Day 1890, he collapsed into a coma; he died in a Naples hotel room the following day; the cause of death was cholesteatoma.

His corpse was then transported by friends to the First Cemetery in Athens. It was interred in a mausoleum shaped like a temple erected in ancient Greek style, designed by Ernst Ziller in the form of an amphiprostyle temple on top of a tall base. The frieze circling the outside of the mausoleum shows Schliemann conducting the excavations at Mycenae and other sites.

== Legacy and criticism ==
The Schliemann mansion in Athens, ca. 1910, now housing the Numismatic Museum of Athens

Schliemann's magnificent residence in the city centre of Athens, the Iliou Melathron (Ιλίου Μέλαθρον, "Palace of Ilium"), today houses the Numismatic Museum of Athens.

Along with Sir Arthur Evans, Schliemann was a pioneer in the study of the Aegean civilization in the Bronze Age. The two men knew of each other, Evans having visited Schliemann's sites. Schliemann had planned to excavate at Knossos but died before fulfilling that dream. Evans bought the site, started excavations in 1900 and stepped in to take charge of the project, which was then still in its infancy.

Further excavation of the Troy site by others indicated that the level Schliemann named the Troy of the Iliad was inaccurate, although they retain the names given by Schliemann. In a 1998 article for The Classical World, D.F. Easton wrote that Schliemann "was not very good at separating fact from interpretation" and claimed that, "Even in 1872 Frank Calvert could see from the pottery that Troy II had to be hundreds of years too early to be the Troy of the Trojan War, a point finally proven by the discovery of Mycenaean pottery in Troy VI in 1890." "King Priam's Treasure" was found in the Troy II level, that of the Early Bronze Age, long before Priam's city of Troy VI or Troy VIIa in the prosperous and elaborate Mycenaean Age. Moreover, the finds were unique. The elaborate gold artefacts do not appear to belong to the Early Bronze Age.

His excavations were condemned by later archaeologists as having destroyed the main layers of the real Troy. Kenneth W. Harl, in the Teaching Company's Great Ancient Civilizations of Asia Minor lecture series, sarcastically claimed that Schliemann's excavations were carried out with such rough methods that he did to Troy what the Greeks could not do in their times, destroying and levelling down the entire city walls to the ground.

In 1972, Professor William Calder of the University of Colorado, speaking at a commemoration of Schliemann's birthday, claimed that he had uncovered several possible problems in Schliemann's work. Other investigators followed, such as Professor David Traill of the University of California.

A 2004 article of the National Geographic Society called into question Schliemann's qualifications, his motives, and his methods:

In northwestern Turkey, Heinrich Schliemann excavated the site believed to be Troy in 1870. Schliemann was a German adventurer and con-man who took sole credit for the discovery, even though he was digging at the site, called Hisarlık, at the behest of British archaeologist Frank Calvert. [...] Eager to find the legendary treasures of Troy, Schliemann blasted his way down to the second city, where he found what he believed were the jewels that once belonged to Helen. As it turns out, the jewels were a thousand years older than the time described in Homer's epic.

Schliemann's methods have been described as "savage and brutal. He ploughed through layers of soil and everything in them without proper record keeping—no mapping of finds, few descriptions of discoveries." His rough excavation, conclusory interpretation and appropriation of artifacts were criticised by contemporary antiquarians, among them Spyridon Comnos and Stephen Salisbury III. The fame of his discoveries overshadowed such criticism through most of the twentieth century, such that Carl Blegen excused his recklessness: "Although there were some regrettable blunders, those criticisms are largely colored by a comparison with modern techniques of digging; but it is only fair to remember that before 1876 very few persons, if anyone, yet really knew how excavations should properly be conducted. There was no science of archaeological investigation, and there was probably no other digger who was better than Schliemann in actual field work."

In 1874, Schliemann also initiated and sponsored the removal of medieval edifices from the Acropolis of Athens, including the great Frankish Tower. Despite considerable opposition, including from King George I of the Hellenes, Schliemann saw the project through. The eminent historian of Frankish Greece, William Miller, later denounced this as "an act of vandalism unworthy of any people imbued with a sense of the continuity of history", and "pedantic barbarism".

In his excavations at Troy, Schliemann found many swastikas adorning pottery and consulted with Aryan nationalist Émile-Louis Burnouf to identify the symbol. Claiming that the symbol was connected with the Aryans, Burnouf adopted and popularised the swastika as a symbol of Aryan nationalism.

== Publications ==
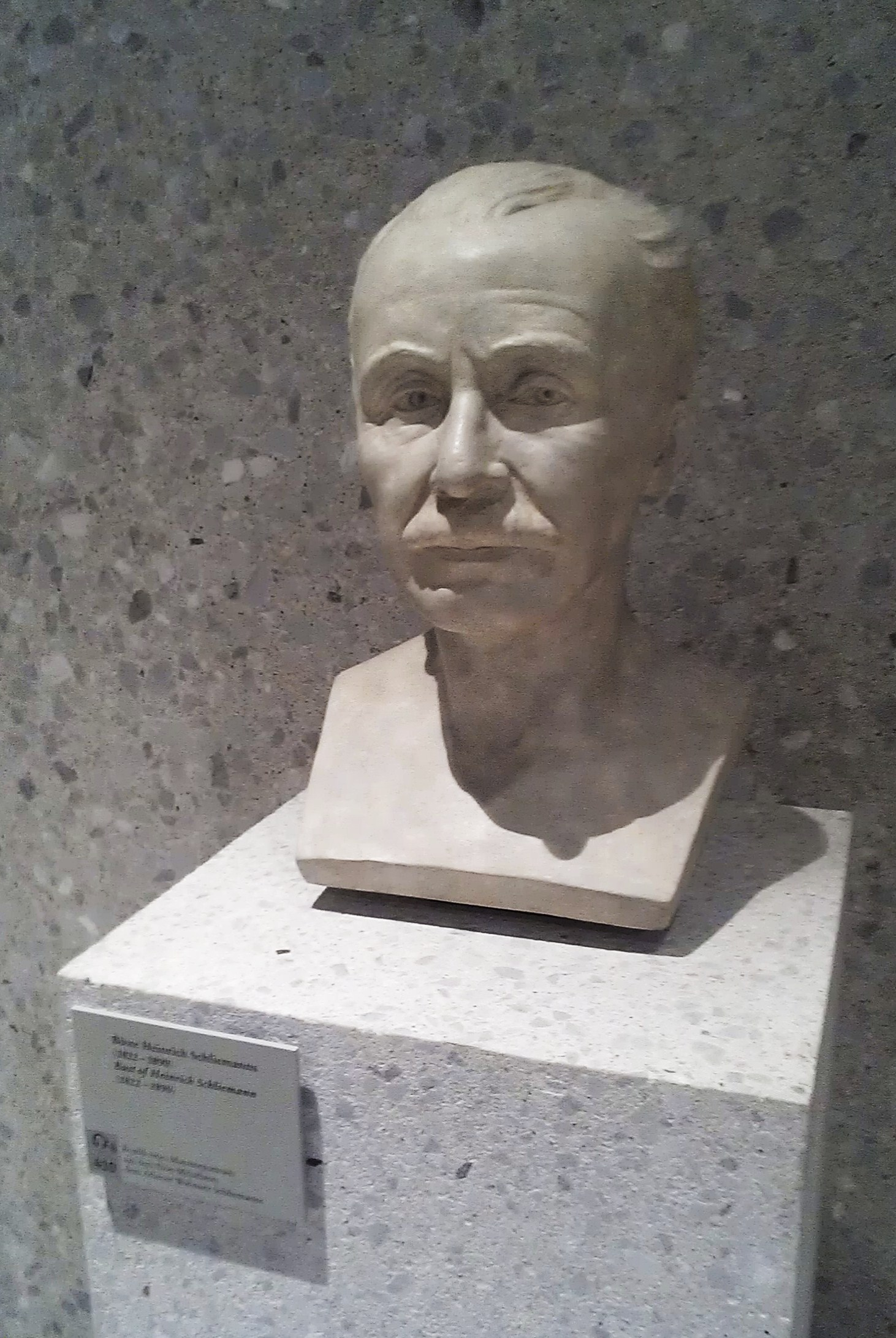
Bust of Schliemann in Neues Museum, Berlin

- La Chine et le Japon au temps présent (1867)
- Ithaka, der Peloponnesus und Troja (1868) (reissued by Cambridge University Press, 2010. ISBN 978-1-108-01682-7)
- Trojanische Altertümer: Bericht über die Ausgrabungen in Troja (1874) (reissued by Cambridge University Press, 2010. ISBN 978-1-108-01703-9)
- Troja und seine Ruinen (1875). Translated into English as Troy and its Remains (1875) (reissued by Cambridge University Press, 2010. ISBN 978-1-108-01717-6)
- Mykena (1878). Translated into English as Mycenae: A Narrative of Researches and Discoveries at Mycenae and Tiryns (1878) (reissued by Cambridge University Press, 2010. ISBN 978-1-108-01692-6)
- Ilios, City and Country of the Trojans (1880) (reissued by Cambridge University Press, 2010. ISBN 978-1-108-01679-7)
- Orchomenos: Bericht über meine Ausgrabungen in Böotischen Orchomenos (1881) (reissued by Cambridge University Press, 2010. ISBN 978-1-108-01718-3)
- Tiryns: Der prähistorische Palast der Könige von Tiryns (1885) (reissued by Cambridge University Press, 2010. ISBN 978-1-108-01720-6). Translated into English Tiryns: The Prehistoric Palace of the Kings of Tiryns (1885)
- Bericht über de Ausgrabungen in Troja im Jahre 1890 (1891) (reissued by Cambridge University Press, 2010. ISBN 978-1-108-01719-0).
- Heinrich Schliemann; Sophia Schliemann (ed.): Heinrich Schliemann's Autobiography. Leipzig, 1892. (Online version in German)

== See also ==
- List of archaeologists
- List of polyglots
- Ernst Boetticher

== Sources ==
- Baelen, Jean (1959). "L'Acropole pendant la guerre d'Indépendance [II. Le drame de la Tour Franque]". Bulletin de l'Association Guillaume Budé (in French). 1 (2): 240–298. doi:10.3406/bude.1959.3856.
- Miller, William (1908). The Latins in the Levant, a History of Frankish Greece (1204–1566). New York: E.P. Dutton and Company.

== Bibliography ==
- Boorstin, Daniel (1983). The Discoverers. Random House. ISBN 978-0-394-40229-1.
- Durant, Will (1939). The Life of Greece: Being a history of Greek civilization from the beginnings, and of civilization in the Near East from the death of Alexander, to the Roman conquest. Simon & Schuster. OCLC 355696346.
- Easton, D.F. (May–June 1998). "Heinrich Schliemann: Hero or Fraud?". The Classical World. 91 (5): 335–343. doi:10.2307/4352102. JSTOR 4352102.
- Poole, Lynn; Poole, Gray (1966). One Passion, Two Loves. Crowell. OCLC 284890..
- Silberman, Neil Asher (1990). Between Past and Present: Archaeology, Ideology, and Nationalism in the Modern Middle East. New York: Doubleday. ISBN 978-0-385-41610-8.
- Tolstikov, Vladimir; Treister, Mikhail (1996). The Gold of Troy. Searching for Homer's Fabled City. Harry N. Abrams. ISBN 978-0-8109-3394-1.
- Traill, David A. (1995). Schliemann of Troy: Treasure and Deceit. New York: St. Martin's Press. ISBN 978-0-312-14042-7.
- Wood, Michael (1987). In Search of the Trojan War. New American Library. ISBN 978-0-452-25960-7.
