= Agamemnon Schliemann =

Greek politician and diplomat (1878–1954)

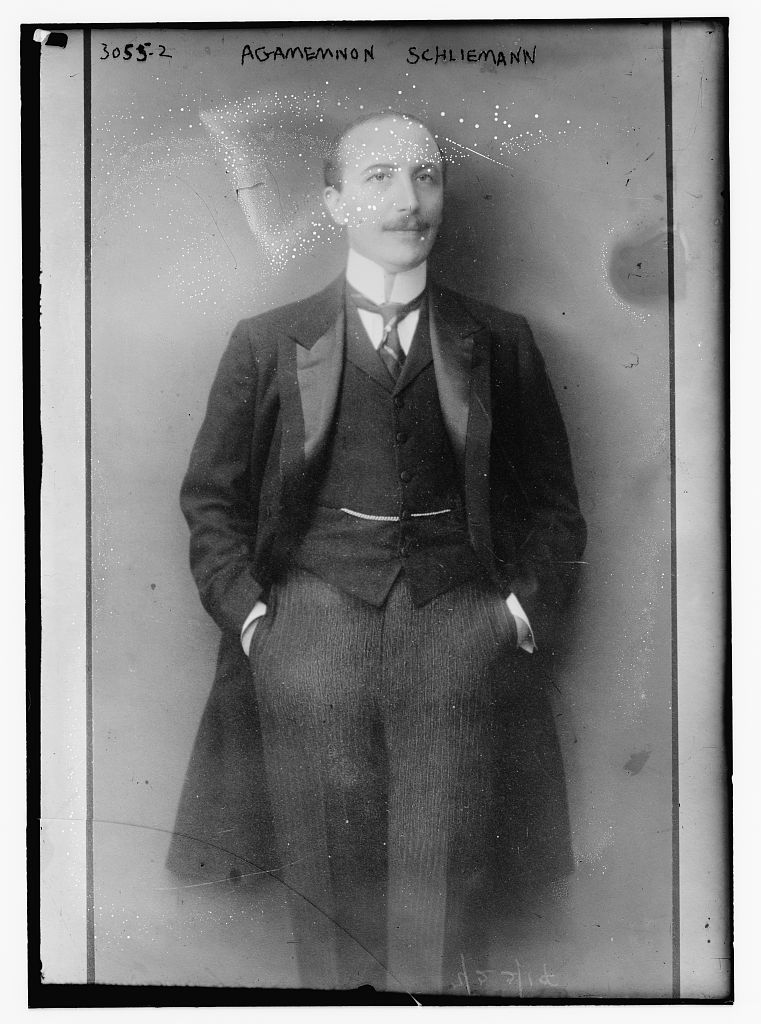
Agamemnon Schliemann, c. 1910–15

Agamemnon Schliemann (Greek: Αγαμέμνων Σλήμαν; 16 March 1878 – 1954) was the Greek ambassador to the United States in 1914.

== Biography ==
Agamemnon Schliemann was born on 16 March 1878 in Paris, France to German-American businessman and amateur archaeologist Heinrich Schliemann and his Greek wife Sophia Schliemann. He was baptized by his father himself, although he was reluctant about it. He was educated in France and Germany. During a trip to the United States in 1900, he established his American citizenship.

In 1902, at the age of 24 years, he married 16-year-old Nadine de Bornemann, daughter of a wealthy businessman in a civil ceremony in New York City, which made it onto the New York Times front page (which read "Eloped from France, Made to Marry Here"). She was the Athens-born daughter of a wealthy Danish businessman.

In 1902 and 1903, he lived in the U.S. Returning to Thessaly, Greece, where he owned a large amount of land, he became the deputy of Larissa in the Hellenic parliament. In January 1914, Schliemann was appointed Greek ambassador to the United States in Washington D.C. in succession to L. A. Koromilas.
