= Priam's Treasure =

Artifacts found by classical archaeologist Heinrich Schliemann

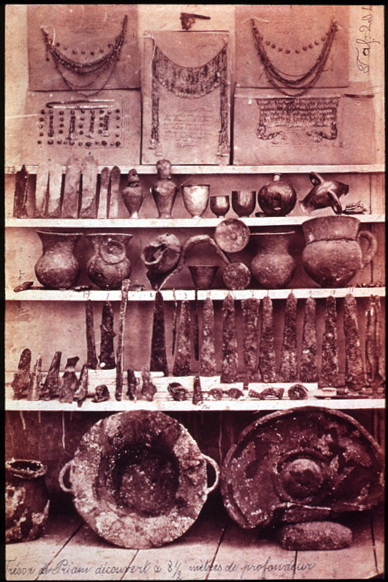
Part of Priam's treasure

Priam's Treasure is a cache of gold and other artifacts discovered by classical archaeologists Frank Calvert and Heinrich Schliemann at Hisarlık on the northwestern coast of modern Turkey in the late 19th century. The majority of the artifacts are currently in the Pushkin Museum in Moscow.

Schliemann claimed the site to be that of Homeric Troy, and assigned the artifacts to the Homeric king Priam. This assignment is now thought to be a result of Schliemann's zeal to find sites and objects mentioned in the Homeric epics which take place in what is now northwestern Turkey. At the time the stratigraphy at Troy had not been solidified, which was done subsequently by the archaeologist Carl Blegen. The layer in which Priam's Treasure was alleged to have been found was assigned to Troy II, whereas Priam would have been king of Troy VI or VII, occupied hundreds of years later.

== Background ==
With the rise of modern critical history, Troy and the Trojan War were consigned to the realms of legend. As early as 1822, however, the famed Scottish journalist and geologist Charles Maclaren had identified the mound at Hisarlık, near the town of Chanak (Çanakkale) in north-western Anatolia, Turkey, as a possible site of Homeric Troy.

Later, starting in the 1840s, Frank Calvert (1828–1908), an English expatriate who was an enthusiastic amateur archaeologist as well as a consular official in the eastern Mediterranean region, began exploratory excavations on the mound, part of which was on a farm belonging to his family, and ended up amassing a large collection of artefacts from the site.

Meanwhile, Heinrich Schliemann, a wealthy international entrepreneur who had achieved a PhD in classics from the University of Rostock in 1869, had begun searching in Turkey for the site of the historical Troy, starting at Pınarbaşı, a hilltop at the south end of the Trojan Plain. Disappointed there, Schliemann was about to give up his explorations when Calvert suggested excavating the mound of Hisarlık. Guided to the site by Calvert, Schliemann conducted excavations there in 1871–73 and 1878–79, uncovering the ruins of a series of ancient cities, dating from the Bronze Age to the Roman period. Schliemann declared one of these cities—at first Troy I, later Troy II—to be the city of Troy, and this identification was widely accepted at that time.

His and Calvert's findings included the thousands of artefacts – such as diadems of woven gold, rings, bracelets, intricate earrings and necklaces, buttons, belts and brooches – which Schliemann chose to call "Priam's treasure".

Schliemann described one great moment of discovery, which supposedly occurred on or about May 27, 1873, in his typically colorful, if unreliable, manner:

In excavating this wall further and directly by the side of the palace of King Priam, I came upon a large copper article of the most remarkable form, which attracted my attention all the more as I thought I saw gold behind it. … In order to withdraw the treasure from the greed of my workmen, and to save it for archaeology, … I immediately had "paidos" (lunch break) called. … While the men were eating and resting, I cut out the Treasure with a large knife…. It would, however, have been impossible for me to have removed the Treasure without the help of my dear wife, who stood by me ready to pack the things which I cut out in her shawl and to carry them away.

Schliemann's oft-repeated story of the treasure being carried by his wife, Sophie, in her shawl was untrue. Schliemann later admitted making it up, saying that at the time of the discovery Sophie was in fact with her family in Athens, following the death of her father.

== Treasure ==
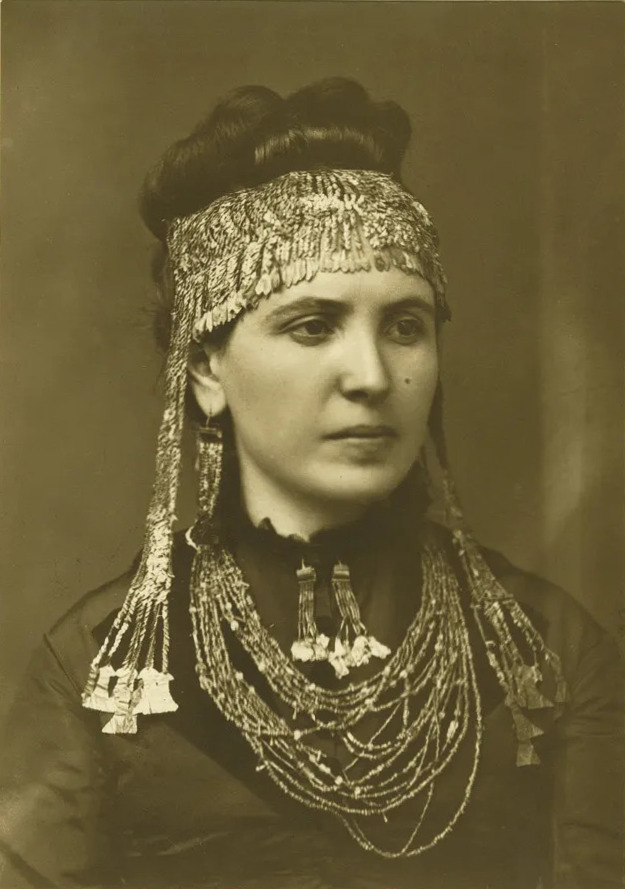
Sophia Schliemann (née Engastromenou) wearing the "Jewels of Helen" excavated by her husband, Heinrich Schliemann, in Hisarlık (photograph taken ca. 1874)

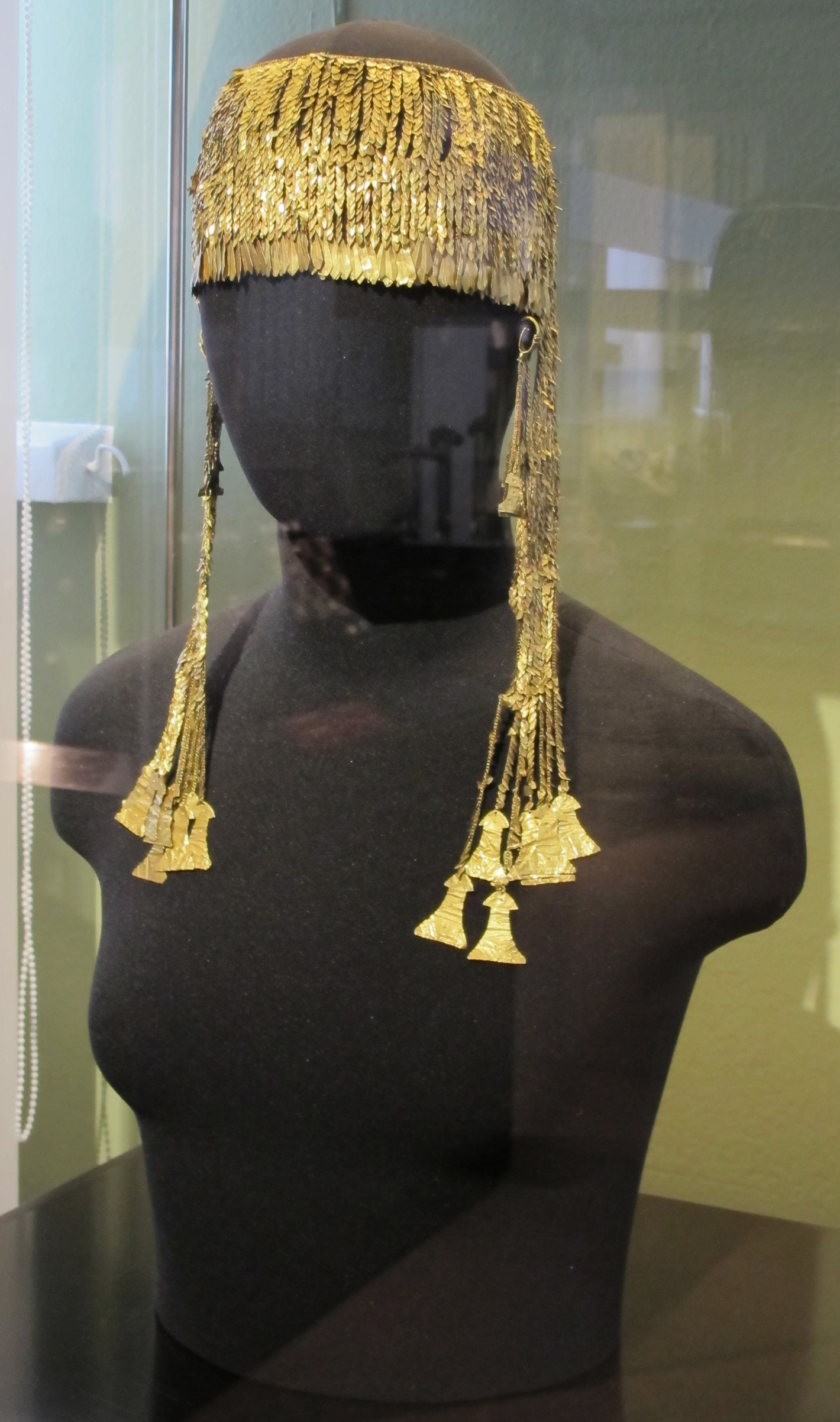
The "big" diadem in modern exhibition

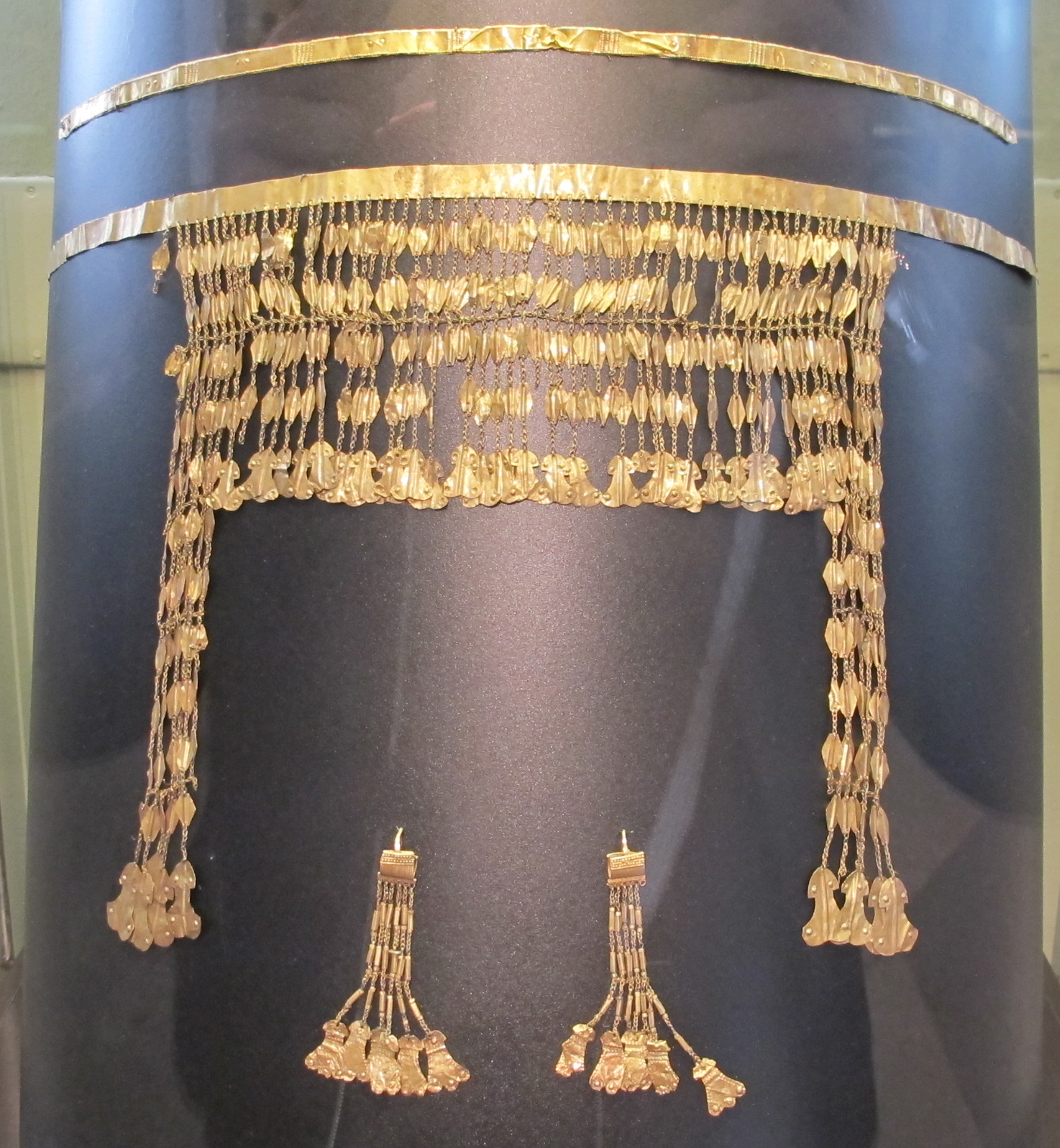
The "small" diadem

A partial catalogue of the treasure is approximately as follows:

- a copper shield
- a copper cauldron with handles
- an unknown copper artifact, perhaps the hasp of a chest
- a silver vase containing two gold diadems (the "Jewels of Helen"), 8750 gold rings, buttons and other small objects, six gold bracelets, two gold goblets
- a copper vase
- a wrought gold bottle
- two gold cups, one wrought, one cast
- a number of red terracotta goblets
- an electrum cup (mixture of gold, silver, and copper)
- six wrought silver knife blades (which Schliemann put forward as money)
- three silver vases with fused copper parts
- more silver goblets and vases
- thirteen copper lance heads
- fourteen copper axes
- seven copper daggers
- other copper artifacts with the key to a chest

== Art collection ==
Apparently, Schliemann smuggled Priam's Treasure out of Anatolia. Officials were informed when his wife, Sophia, wore Helen of Troy's golden diadem and necklaces in public. The Ottoman official assigned to watch the excavation, Amin Effendi, received a prison sentence. The Ottoman government revoked Schliemann's permission to dig and sued him for its share of the gold. Schliemann went on to Mycenae. There, however, the Greek Archaeological Society sent an agent to monitor him.

Later Schliemann traded some treasure to the government of the Ottoman Empire in exchange for permission to dig at Troy again. It is located in the Istanbul Archaeology Museum. The rest was acquired in 1881 by the Royal Museums of Berlin (Königliche Museen zu Berlin).

After the capture of the Zoo Tower by the Red Army during the Battle in Berlin, Professor Wilhelm Unverzagt turned the treasure over to the Soviet Art Committee, saving it from plunder and division. The artefacts were then flown to Moscow. During the Cold War, the Soviet government denied any knowledge of the fate of Priam's Treasure. Rumours abounded: that it was in a vault in Leningrad (closest to the truth), that it was secretly owned by an American millionaire, and that the hoard had been melted down to fund a Nazi pension fund. Finally, in 1994 the Pushkin Museum admitted it possessed the Trojan gold.

Russia keeps what the West terms the looted art as compensation for the destruction of Russian cities and looting of Russian museums by Nazi Germany in World War II. A 1998 Russian law, the Federal Law on Cultural Valuables Displaced to the USSR as a Result of the Second World War and Located on the Territory of the Russian Federation, legalizes the looting in Germany as compensation and prevents Russian authorities from proceeding to restitutions.

== Authenticity ==
In addition to the criticism of Schliemann's archeological methods and motivations, doubts about the authenticity of the treasure and its story have long been raised.

Schliemann's haste in terming it "Priam's Treasure" has long been criticised, and the described layer of origin is now agreed to be prior to King Priam's lifetime. The artefacts themselves are likely to be a composite of multiple finds across the site rather than one hoard in Schliemann's account. Schliemann himself is known to have falsified his initial description of the finding circumstances, exaggerating Sophia's role in the excavations, and planting a story that the treasure had been smuggled away from the site in Sophia's shawl.
