= Panchev =

Panchev (Bulgarian: Панчев; also appearing in the transliteration variants Pančev, Pantschew or Pantschow) – with its female form Pancheva (Bulgarian: Панчева) – is a Bulgarian and Macedonian surname which is derived from the male given name Pancho (Bulgarian: Панчо; also transliterated as Pančo or Panco), a shortened version of the Bulgarian given name Panayot (Bulgarian: Панайот) that stems from the Greek name Panagiotis (Greek: Παναγιώτης), meaning "all-holy."

Notable people with the name Panchev/Pančev include:

- Asen Panchev (1906–1989), Bulgarian footballer
- Gavrail Panchev (born 1954), Bulgarian author, researcher and publicist
- Darko Pančev (born 1965), retired Macedonian footballer
