= Panagiota =

Feminine Greek given name

- Gender: Female
- Language: Greek

Origin
- Meaning: All-holy

Other names
- Alternative spelling: Panayiota
- Related names: Panagiotis

Panagiota (Greek: Παναγιώτα), alternatively spelled as Panayiota, is a feminine Greek given name. It is derived from the Greek epithet Panagia (Greek: Παναγία), meaning 'All-holy', for Mary. It has five name days (April 5, April 25, June 24, August 15, and December 26), which it shares with its male counterpart Panagiotis.

== Notable people ==
- Panayiota Andreou (born 1995), Cypriot sport shooter
- Panayiota Bertzikis, author and activist
- Panagiota Chatzicharistou (born 2000), Greek footballer
- Panagiota Daskalopoulos, mathematics professor
- Panagiota Dosi (born 2001), Greek track and field athlete
- Panagiota Fatourou, Greek computer scientist
- Panagiota "Peny" Karagkouni (born 1993), Greek beach volleyball player
- Panagiota Klentrou, kinesiology professor
- Panagiota Lytra (born 2006), Greek rhythmic gymnast
- Panayiota Poirazi (born 1974), Cypriot neuroscientist
- Panagiota Riga (born 1988), Cypriot footballer
- Panagiota "Pola" Roupa (born 1969), Greek anarchist
- Panagiota Tsakiri (born 1990), Greek biathlete and cross-country skier
- Panayiota Tsinopoulou (born 1990), Greek race walker
- Panagiota Tsitsela (born 1972), Greek rhythmic gymnast
- Panayiota Vlahaki (born 1991), Greek long-distance runner
- Tracy Spiridakos (born 1988), Actress

== See also ==
- Panayiotou, a surname also derived from Panagia
