= Panagiotis =

Greek male name

- Pronunciation: IPA: [panaˈʝotis]
- Gender: Male
- Language: Greek

Origin
- Meaning: All-holy
- Region of origin: Greece

Other names
- Alternative spelling: Panayiotis

Panagiotis or Panayiotis (Greek: Παναγιώτης, IPA: [panaˈʝotis]) is a common male Greek name. It derives from the Greek epithet Panagia or Panayia ("All-Holy") for Mary. The feminine form of the name is Panagiota or Panayiota (Παναγιὡτα).

The name day for Panagiotis is usually on 15 August, on the day of the Dormition of the Theotokos, and celebrated together with Maria, Mario, Mary, Despoina (or Despina). In some cases, it can be set on other feast days of the Virgin Mary celebrated by the Greek Orthodox Church (e.g. 2 February, 26 December). There are many diminutives of Panagiotis such as Panos (Πάνος), Notis (Νότης), Panagis/Panayis (Παναγής), Takis (Τάκης, from the diminutive Panagiotakis or Panayiotakis), Panikos (Πανίκος, in Cyprus) and Pit (Πιτ) while Panagiota, or Panayiota, is commonly reduced to Giota or Yiota (Γιώτα), and Nota (Νότα).

== Notable people ==
- Panagiotis Anagnostopoulos, Greek revolutionary and member of the Filiki Eteria
- Panagiotis Beglitis, Greek politician
- Panagiotis Chinofotis, Greek admiral and politician
- Panayiotis Chronis, Greek football player
- Panagiotis Danglis, Greek general and politician
- Panayiotis Demetriou, Cypriot politician
- Panagiotis Doxaras, Greek painter of the 17th/18th century
- Panagiotis Efstratiadis, Greek archaeologist
- Panagiotis Engomitis, Cypriot football midfielder
- Panagiotis Fasoulas, Greek basketball player and politician
- Panagiotis Gennadius, Greek botanist and agronomist
- Panagiotis Giannakis, Greek basketball player and coach
- Panayiotis Kafkis, Greek professional basketball player
- Panagiotis Kalaitzakis, Greek basketball player
- Panos Kammenos, Greek politician
- Panagiotis Kanellopoulos, Greek politician and two-time Prime Minister of Greece
- Panagiotis Karatzas (died 1824), Greek revolutionary leader
- Panagiotis Karatzas, Greek basketball player
- Panos Karnezis, Greek writer
- Panagiotis Kavvadias, Greek archaeologist
- Panayiotis Kokoras, Greek composer
- Panagiotis Kondylis, Greek social scientist and historian of philosophy
- Panayiotis Kythreotis, Cypriot football player
- Panagiotis Lafazanis, Greek politician
- Panayotis Alexi Lalas, American soccer player
- Panagiotis Lagos, Greek football player
- Panayiotis Loizides (businessman), Cypriot businessman
- Panagiotis Manias, Greek basketball player
- Panagiotis Markouizos, Greek figure skater and six-time Greek champion
- Panagiotis Meltemis, Greek poet
- Panayiotis Panayiotou Cypriot football player
- Panos Panagiotopoulos, Greek politician
- Panagiotis Papadopoulos, Greek fashion designer based in Sweden
- Panayiotis Paphides, British journalist
- Panagiotis Paraskevopoulos, Greek athlete, 1896 and 1900 Olympics
- Panayotis Pascot; French comedian and actor
- Panayiotis Pikrammenos, Greek judge, politician, President of the Council of State, and Prime Minister of Greece
- Panagiotis Pipinelis, Greek diplomat, politician and Prime Minister of Greece
- Panayotis Potagos, Greek physician and explorer
- Panagiotis Poulitsas, Greek judge, archaeologist, President of the Council of State and Prime Minister of Greece
- Panayiotis Pounnas Cypriot footballer
- Panagiotis Roumeliotis, Greek politician
- Panagiotis Sarris, Greek sprinter
- Panagiotis Sekeris, Greek merchant and member of the Filiki Eteria
- Panayiotis Simopoulos, Greek model
- Panagiotis Skagiopoulos, Greek merchant and philanthropist
- Panos Skourletis, Greek politician
- Panagiotis E. Souganidis, Greek mathematician
- Panagiotis Soutsos, Greek poet
- Panayiotis Spyrou, Cypriot football defender
- Panagiotis Stamatakis, Greek archaeologist
- Panagiotis Stroubakos, Greek runner
- Panagiotis Tachtsidis, Greek footballer
- Panagiotis Tarinidis, French powerlifter
- Panayiotis Tetsis, Greek painter
- Panagis Tsaldaris, Greek politician and two-time Prime Minister of Greece
- Panagiotis Tsakos, Greek shipowner
- Panayiotis "Peter" Vagenas, American soccer player
- Panayotis Varotsos, Greek academic and physicist
- Panagiotis Vasilopoulos, Greek basketball player
- Panagiotis Verdes, Greek inventor
- Panagis Vourloumis, Greek politician
- Panayiotis Xiourouppas, Cypriot footballer
- Panayiotis Yamarelos, Greek academic and coroner
- Panayiotis Vassilakis (Takis), Greek artist
- Panayiotis Zavos, Greek Cypriot reproductive biologist

== Other uses of the name ==
- MV Panagiotis, a ship now wrecked on the shore of the Greek island of Zakynthos

== See also ==
- Panayiotou/Panagiotou, the surname equivalent
- Panayot (disambiguation)
- Panait
