= Frankish Tower (Acropolis of Athens) =

Former medieval tower in present-day Greece

- Φραγκικός Πύργος
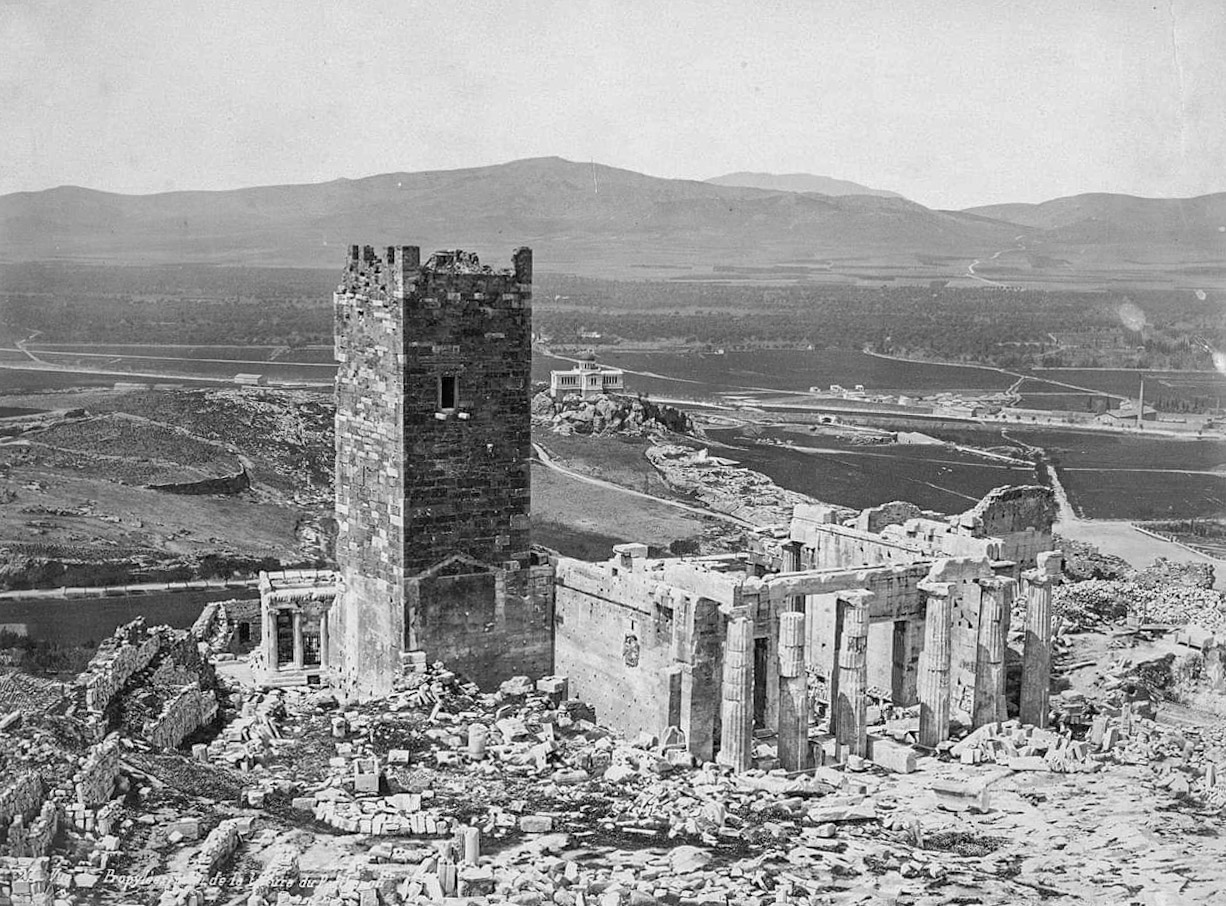
- Photograph of the tower in 1874, with the ruins of the Propylaia and view west over the Athenian plain towards Mount Aigaleo

- Plan of ancient monuments of the Acropolis of Athens. The tower was immediately southwest of the Propylaia (6), behind the Temple of Athena Nike (7).

General information
- Location: Acropolis of Athens
- Coordinates: 37°58′18″N 23°43′30″E
- Completed: Unclear; probably between 1205 and 1458
- Demolished: 1875

Height
- Height: 85 ft (26 m)

The Frankish Tower (Greek: Φραγκικός Πύργος, romanised: Frankikos Pyrgos) was a medieval tower built on the Acropolis of Athens. The date and circumstances of its construction are unclear, but it was probably built as part of the palace of the Dukes of Athens, who ruled the city between 1205 and 1458 during what was known as the Frankokratia. The tower was on the western side of the Acropolis, near the monumental gateway known as the Propylaia. Throughout its history, the tower was used as a watchtower, a beacon, a salt-store and a prison. During the Greek War of Independence, the height of the tower was increased, and it was used to imprison the revolutionary Odysseas Androutsos, who was killed there in 1825.

The tower's presence on the Acropolis was controversial, particularly after 1834, when the government of King Otto of Greece undertook to clear the site of its post-classical remains. The tower was initially exempted from this project for its perceived aesthetic value, as well as its symbolic role in affirming a connection between western Europe and classical Greek culture. However, it was seen as a foreign imposition upon the Acropolis by many in Greece, particularly archaeological figures such as Kyriakos Pittakis and Lysandros Kaftanzoglou. In 1875, with funding from the German businessman Heinrich Schliemann, the tower was demolished, to widespread criticism outside Greece.

== Name ==
The name Frankish Tower reflects the presumed association between the tower and the medieval Frankish rulers who held power in Athens between 1205 and 1458. It has also been known as the "Venetian Tower", reflecting an erroneous belief that it was constructed during the Venetian occupation of Athens in 1687–1688. Under Ottoman rule, the tower came to be known as Goulas or Koulas (Γουλάς/Κουλάς), from the Turkish kule, meaning 'tower'. In the seventeenth century, the French doctor and archaeologist Jacob Spon recorded that the tower was popularly known as the "Arsenal of Lycurgus" and was falsely believed to date to the fourth century BCE. After 1825, the tower was sometimes known as "Odysseus's Tower", after the Greek revolutionary Odysseas (Odysseus) Androutsos, who was imprisoned there in that year. It is also occasionally referred to as the "Tuscan Tower".

== Location and appearance ==
The tower was situated on the western corner of the Acropolis of Athens, next to the Propylaia. There was probably no access between the two buildings, as paintings and photographs from the nineteenth century show the tower's entrance above ground, on the second floor of the eastern face, some 6 metres (20 ft) above the architrave of the Propylaia. Literary sources attest that the door was accessible by means of an external wooden staircase. Some photographs also show a ground entrance on the western side, suggesting that the lower portion of the tower was separate from the upper floors, and used as a prison or storage room.

The tower was built of stone from the quarries of Penteli and Piraeus; the builders also made heavy use of material (spolia) from the ancient buildings of the Acropolis. It was rectangular in shape, 28.5 feet (8.7 m) long and 25.5 feet (7.8 m) wide, and its walls had a thickness of 5.75 feet (1.75 m) at their base. With a height of 85 feet (26 m), its top, accessible through a wooden staircase, held a commanding view over the central plain of Attica and the surrounding mountains. The north side of the tower had a small, square turret that projected from the wall: according to a 1908 history by the medievalist William Miller, this could be used to light a beacon visible from Acrocorinth in the Peloponnese. During the Ottoman period, the turret hosted two small cannons which could be used to signal an alarm. Sketches from the late seventeenth century onwards show that the tower was once crenellated.

== History ==
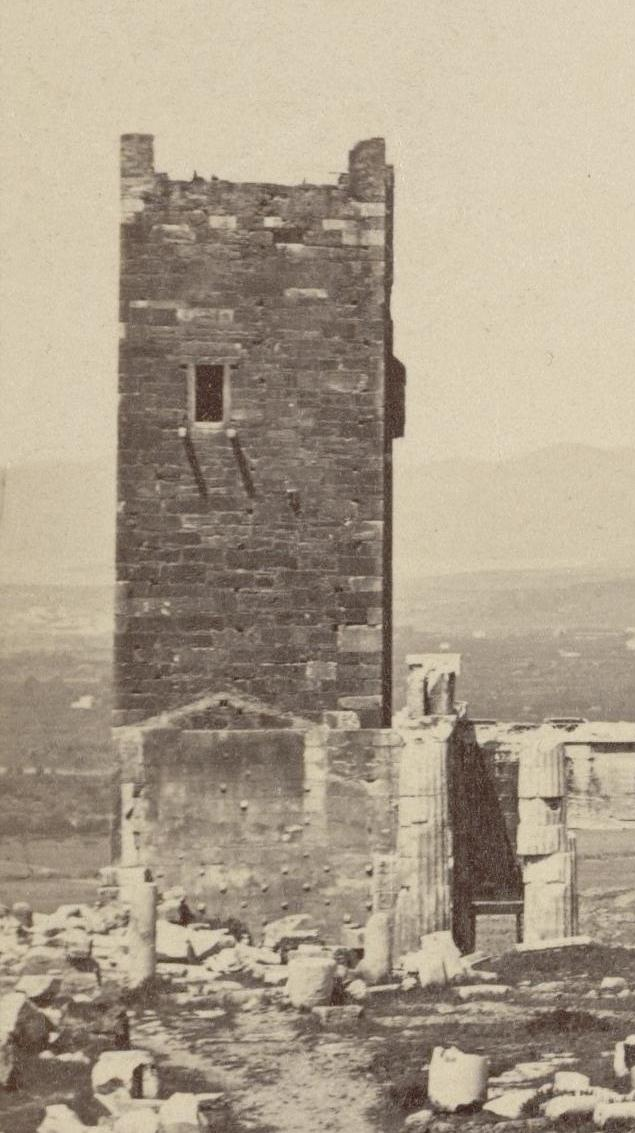
Close-up view of the tower

The date of the tower's construction is unclear and now impossible to reconstruct with any certainty following the tower's demolition. Construction is usually ascribed to the Florentine Acciaioli family, who ruled the Duchy of Athens between 1388 and its fall to the Ottoman Empire in 1458, since it was they who converted the Propylaia complex into a palace. However, according to medievalist Peter Lock, the tower "might equally be ascribed" to the first dynasty of Frankish dukes of Athens, the 13th-century de la Roche family, who also had a residence on the site, of which no details are known. In the nineteenth century, the classicist John Pentland Mahaffy tried to argue that the tower dated to the occupation of Athens by the Venetian commander Francesco Morosini between 1687 and 1688; his theory was disproven by the existence of engravings from the occupation, which showed that the tower predated it.

The tower may have been the inspiration for the "grete tour" ('great tower') in the palace of the Duke of Athens, where Palamon is imprisoned in Chaucer's The Knight's Tale. Under Ottoman rule, the tower was used as a salt store and a prison. When the Greek War of Independence broke out in 1821, twelve Athenian notables were imprisoned there by the Ottoman authorities as hostages, of whom nine were executed during the 1821–1822 siege of the Acropolis by the Greek rebels and three managed to escape. The tower was heightened between 1821 and 1826 to provide greater visibility to those using it as an observation post. In 1825, following his capture by the Greeks after his defection to the Ottomans, the revolutionary Odysseas Androutsos was imprisoned at the tower, tortured and killed. His body was found at the foot of the tower on 17 June [O.S. 5 June]. (Note: Greece adopted the Gregorian calendar in 1923; 28 February [O.S. 15 February] was followed by 1 March. In this article, this date and all subsequent dates are given in the "New Style" Gregorian calendar, while dates before it are given in the "Old Style" Julian calendar.) Observers reported seeing a rope hanging down from the tower's window, supposedly used by Androutsos during a failed escape attempt, until 1840. By the 1870s, the tower was home to hundreds of owls.

== Demolition ==
=== Background ===
After the Greek War of Independence, arguments for the tower's demolition came from archaeologists, who believed that the spolia used in the tower's construction might include valuable inscriptions, and from those who saw it as an intrusion on the earlier Greek remains of the Acropolis. In July 1834, the German architect Leo von Klenze arrived in Athens to advise the Greek king Otto on the development of the city. At Klenze's instigation, the Acropolis was demilitarised and designated an archaeological site on 30 August [O.S. 18 August]. Klenze, despite his general determination to remove post-classical remains from the Acropolis, favoured the preservation of the medieval structures near the Propylaia for what he considered their "picturesque" appeal, a view shared by Carl Wilhelm von Heideck, a member of Otto's regency council. The proposal to remove the tower was also opposed in France, including by the scholar Jean Alexandre Buchon, where it was seen as a source of pride through its perceived association with Frankish crusaders, and as a symbol of the continuity between ancient Greek and modern French culture. Other critics of the plan to remove the tower, such as the traveller and novelist Elliot Warburton, considered that the tower had aesthetic value and had become part of the well-known skyline of the Acropolis.

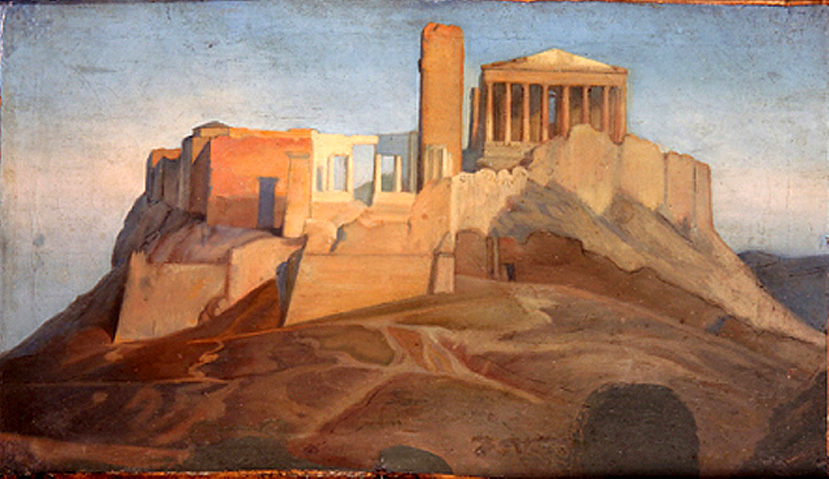
The Acropolis of Athens, painted by Jean Auguste Dominique Ingres in the 1840s: the Frankish Tower is visible in the centre.

The archaeologist Kyriakos Pittakis was an early advocate of demolition, while foreign visitors labelled the tower a "barbarous sentinel" and complained that it interrupted the view of the Parthenon. In the Greek press, the architect and academic Lysandros Kaftanzoglou compared the tower, which he considered of Turkish origin and called "barbarian", with the droppings of birds of prey. Kaftanzoglou's later work repairing some of the Acropolis's retaining walls, in which he boasted that "no deviation from the ancient line was effected nor use of alien material", has been described as a manifestation of the classicising ideology behind the demolition of the Frankish Tower, and much of the subsequent restoration work on the Acropolis throughout the nineteenth century.

=== Removal of the tower ===
In the summer of 1874, the German archaeologist and businessman Heinrich Schliemann visited Athens. He had been trying for a number of years to secure a permit to excavate in Greece, first unsuccessfully petitioning for the site of Olympia and later for that of Mycenae. On 29 June [O.S. 17 June], he proposed to the General Ephorate of Antiquities that he fund the demolition of the Frankish Tower, which he considered would cost him 12,000 francs: he explained this decision as a "service to science", though it has also been characterised as an attempt to ingratiate himself with the Greek authorities and expedite his requests for an archaeological permit. He believed that the demolition would be popular, remarking that "everyone in [Athens] was delighted" with the prospect, except for the thousands of owls that lived in the tower. Schliemann was also granted the right to publish any inscriptions found during the demolition, though none eventually materialised.

Schliemann proposed that the work would be carried out by the Archaeological Society of Athens and directed by the sculptor Napoleone Martinelli, one of its members. Panagiotis Efstratiadis, a prominent member of the society and the head of the Greek Archaeological Service, obtained ministerial approval for the request, and oversaw Schliemann's payment of an initial 4,000 drachmas to Martinelli on 1 July [O.S. 19 June] to cement the deal. However, the operation's beginning was delayed by the intervention of King George I and by the reluctance of Greek government ministers to give final permission. Schliemann presented a further 9,000 drachmas to the Archaeological Society, whose committee subsequently voted in favour of the demolition – despite the objection of the society's president, Filippos Ioannou, that destroying the tower would reinforce foreign complaints that Greece had shown insufficient care for its medieval monuments – on 14 July [O.S. 2 July].

Work began on 14 July [O.S. 2 July], amid great publicity organised by Schliemann, but a few days later the demolition was halted by order of King George, prompting Schliemann to write him an indignant letter of protest. In September, the Ministry of Religious Affairs and Public Education, which directed the Archaeological Service, declared that the demolition should be delayed, on the grounds that the time was not right for it. The operation finally resumed on 3 July [O.S. 21 June] 1875 and was completed on 2 October [O.S. 20 September]. The archaeological historian Fani Mallouchou-Tufano has suggested that the Great Eastern Crisis of 1875, in which nationalist rebellions had arisen in parts of the Balkans still under Ottoman rule, played a role in encouraging Greeks to see the removal of the post-classical structure as a means of reinforcing their "national confidence and certainty". The demolition eventually cost Schliemann £465 (equivalent to £46,655 in 2019), and was the last removal to date of a building from the Acropolis.

=== Reaction ===
The demolition drew considerable criticism at the time; the French poet Théophile Gautier called the tower an "integral part of the Athenian horizon". The British historian Edward Augustus Freeman wrote an anonymous article on 21 July [O.S. 9 July] 1877, later published under his name in the Trieste-based Greek newspaper Klio, which condemned the demolition as "paltry" and as "wanton destruction". The historian of Frankish Greece, William Miller, later called it "an act of vandalism unworthy of any people imbued with a sense of the continuity of history" and "pedantic barbarism". Kaftanzoglou and his colleague Stefanos Koumanoudis, however, writing on behalf of the Archaeological Society of Athens, defended the demolition as "the restoration of the Greek character of the shining face of the Acropolis, pure and unsullied by anything foreign".

== Sources ==
- Athanassopoulou, Effie F. (2002). "An 'Ancient' Landscape: European Ideals, Archaeology, and Nation Building in Early Modern Greece". Journal of Modern Greek Studies. 20 (2): 273–305. doi:10.1353/mgs.2002.0018. ISSN 1086-3265. S2CID 143979066.
- Baelen, Jean (1959). "L'Acropole pendant la guerre d'Indépendance [II. Le drame de la Tour Franque]". Bulletin de l'Association Guillaume Budé (in French). 1 (2): 240–298. doi:10.3406/bude.1959.3856.
- Giochalas, Thanasis; Kafetzaki, Tonia (2013). Αθήνα. Ιχνηλατώντας την πόλη με οδηγό την ιστορία και τη λογοτεχνία [Athens. Tracing the city through History and Literature] (in Greek). Athens: Estia. ISBN 978-960-05-1559-6.
- Hamilakis, Yannis (2007). The Nation and Its Ruins: Antiquity, Archaeology, and National Imagination in Greece. Oxford University Press. ISBN 978-0-19-923038-9.
- Hurwit, Jeffrey M. (1999). The Athenian Acropolis: History, Mythology, and Archaeology from the Neolithic Era to the Present. Cambridge University Press. ISBN 978-0-521-42834-7.
- Kiminas, Demetrius (2009). The Ecumenical Patriarchate. San Bernardino: The Borgo Press. ISBN 978-1-4344-5876-6.
- Lock, Peter (1986). "The Frankish Towers of Central Greece". The Annual of the British School at Athens. 81: 101–123. doi:10.1017/S0068245400020104. S2CID 129263771.
- Lock, Peter (1987). "The Frankish Tower on the Acropolis, Athens: The Photographs of William J. Stillman". The Annual of the British School at Athens. 82: 131–133. doi:10.1017/S0068245400020384. JSTOR 30103084. S2CID 163963456.
- Mallouchou-Tufano, Fani (1994). "The History of Interventions on the Acropolis". In Economakis, Richard (ed.). Acropolis Restoration: The CCAM Interventions. Athens: Academy Editions. pp. 69–85. ISBN 978-1-85490-344-0.
- Mallouchou-Tufano, Fani (2007). "The Vicissitudes of the Athenian Acropolis in the Nineteenth Century: From Castle to Monument". In Valavanis, Panos (ed.). Great Moments in Greek Archaeology. Athens: Kapon Press. pp. 36–57. ISBN 978-0-89236-910-2.
- Miller, William (1908). The Latins in the Levant: A History of Frankish Greece (1204–1566). London: John Murray. OCLC 1157183453.
- Moorehead, Caroline (2016). Priam's Gold: Schliemann and the Lost Treasures of Troy. London: Tauris Parke Paperbacks. ISBN 978-1-78453-487-5.
- St. Clair, William (2022). St Clair, David; Barnes, Lucy (eds.). Who Saved the Parthenon? A New History of the Acropolis Before, During and After the Greek Revolution (PDF). Cambridge: Open Book Publishers. doi:10.11647/OBP.0136. ISBN 978-1-78374-461-9. S2CID 248842303. Archived from the original (PDF) on 27 May 2022.
- Vasilikou, Dora (2011). Το χρονικό της ανασκαφής των Μυκηνών, 1870–1878 [The Chronology of the Excavation of Mycenae, 1870–1878] (PDF) (in Greek). Athens: Archaeological Society of Athens. ISBN 978-960-8145-87-0.
