= Panait =

Panait is a Romanian name derived from the Greek Panagiotis. It is the equivalent of the Bulgarian name Panayot. Other forms include Panaiot, Panaiote, Panaiut, Panaet, Panaitescu and Panaitache.

== Surname ==
- Bogdan Panait (born 1983), Romanian football player
- Cristian Panait, Romanian prosecutor
- Enache Panait (born 1949), Romanian wrestler
- Ion Panait (born 1981), Romanian Greco-Roman wrestler

== Given name ==
- Panait Cerna (1881–1913), Romanian poet, philosopher, literary critic and translator
- Panait S. Dumitru or Perpessicius (1891–1971), Romanian literary historian and critic, poet, essayist and fiction writer
- Panait Istrati (1884–1935), Romanian writer of French and Romanian expression
- Panait Mușoiu (1864–1944), Romanian anarchist and socialist activist, author of the first Romanian translation of The Communist Manifesto

== See also ==
- Panai (disambiguation)
- Panaitan
- Panarit
