= Julie von Nordenpflycht =

Julie von Nordenpflycht (1786–1842), was a Greek-German noblewoman, letter writer and court office holder. She was the lady-in-waiting of the queen of Greece, Amalia of Oldenburg.

== Biography ==
She was a native of the Holy Roman Empire. She arrived to Greece after Amalia of Oldenburg became queen of Greece in 1836, and was given a position in the newly formed Greek Royal Household.

=== Greek Court ===
The Greek Royal Household was formed for the first time at this time period, as Greece had just become an independent monarchy. There was no tradition of a royal court and almost all of the courtiers were Germans who had accompanied the king and queen from Germany, except for a few members of the Greek elite. The ladies-in-waiting of the first queen of independent Greece was organized in one Grande-Maitresse, followed by three second rank dames d'honneur, and two dames de palais. The position of principal lady in waiting (Grande-Maitresse) was given to Dorothea von Weichs-Glon, wife of the queen's chamberlain Clemens von Weichs-Glon, while Julie von Nordenpflycht was made dame d'honneur.

=== Favorite ===
Nordenpflycht was a confidante and favorite of the queen. Her strong position at court was known; and, in Greece, she was referred to by the public by a sobriquet Lüth mentioned in her Danish-language diary as Dronningens Amme, which was Danish for "The Queens Wet Nurse" or "The Queen's Nurse". In 1839, the principal lady-in-waiting Dorothea von Weichs-Glon was dismissed from service because of her excessive drinking, and von Nordenpflycht acted as her replacement until the arrival of the appointed successor Wilhelmine von Plüskow from Germany. This caused a conflict at court as Weichs was discontent over her dismissal, and von Nordenpflycht discontent in having to surrender her position to von Plüskow, and there was a rivalry between von Nordenpflycht and von Plüskow. During this time, there was a growing crisis around the childlessness of the royal couple. The childlessness was to some extent blamed on the queen's love for riding and dancing, and when Plüskow advised her to stop in order to conceive, but was contradicted by Julie von Nordenpflycht, who successfully pointed out about the queen that "She is so young, it is an innocent pleasure for her who has so few".

Nordenpflycht died in 1842. She was replaced in the queen's confidence by Wilhelmine von Plüskow.

== Legacy ==
She is described by the diarist Christiane Lüth. Several of her letters from Greece to her relatives in Germany are preserved, which gives valuable documentation about the Greek court life.
