= Wilhelmine von Plüskow =

German noblewoman

Juliane Wilhelmine Ditlefine von Plüskow (née von Witzleben; 1793 –1872) was a German noblewoman and Greek court office holder. Von Plüskow was the principal lady-in-waiting of the queen of Greece Amalia of Oldenburg from 1839 to 1862. Von Plüskow was considered to have a strong influence with the queen. Von Plüskow was described in the diary of Christiane Lüth.

== Early years ==
Juliane Wilhelmine Ditlefine von Witzleben was born as the youngest of four daughters of Christoph Burkhardt Reiniger von Witzleben (1760-1815) and his wife, Hedwig Dorothea von Rumohr (1764-1844). Wilhelmine married Baron Karl Philipp von Plüskow (1788-1821), and was the mother of Josias von Plüskow (1815-1894). She was from Oldenburg in what is today Germany.

== Court life ==
Oldenburg was also the home of Duchess Amalia of Oldenburg, who married King Otto in 1836, becoming the queen consort. In 1839, Von Plüskow left for Greece to become the grand mistress of the newly formed Greek royal household. Von Plüskow's predecessor, "Madame Willy" (Dorothea von und zu Weichs an der Glon), had been dismissed by Queen Amelia due to alcoholism.

=== Greece ===
The Greek Royal Household was new as Greece had just become an independent monarchy and there was no tradition of a royal court before. The ladies-in-waiting of the first queen of independent Greece was organized in one Grande-Maitresse, followed by three second rank dame d'honneur, and two dame de palais.

When von Plüskow arrived in Athens, she took over from the dame d'honneur Julie von Nordenpflycht, the acting grand mistress. Von Plüskow and grand marshal P. Notaras imposed a strict court etiquette in the royal household. She acted as the intermediary of the queen and the foreign ambassadors of Athens.

Von Plüskow was a favorite and confidant of Queen Amelia. Due to this, von Plüskow was widely rumored to influence state affairs, particularly in matters relating to Austria, through both the queen and the king, of which exposed her to controversy. During this time period, there was an ongoing crisis around the childlessness of the royal couple. The queen loved to dance and ride, and Plüskow advised her to stop these activities in order to conceive, but was contradicted by the queen's influential dame d’honneur Julie von Nordenpflycht, known in Greece as "The Queen's Nurse". Von Nordenpflycht said that the queen was a young woman who deserved her few pleasures.

=== Later life ===
In 1862, King Otto was deposed and the royal family was forced to flee Greece. During this period of upheaval, the press reported that the royal courtiers were generally unmolested. However, the exception was von Plüskow, who experienced “heckling” while boarding a British ship to leave the kingdom.

Von Plüskow moved with the royal family to Bavaria, where she continued to serve as Queen Amalia's principal lady-in-waiting.
