= Simopoulos =

Simopoulos (Greek: Σιμόπουλος) is a Greek surname. The feminine form is Simopoulou (Σιμοπούλου). Notable people with the surname include:

- Charalambos Simopoulos (1874–1942), Greek diplomat
- Dionysis Simopoulos (1943–2022), Greek physicist and astronomer
- Panayiotis Simopoulos, Greek model
