= Panagiotis Efstratiadis =

Greek archaeologist (1815–1888)

- Παναγιώτης Ευστρατιάδης
- Born: 1815; Mantamados, Lesbos, Ottoman Empire
- Died: 7 August [O.S. 26 July] 1888 (aged 72–73); Athens, Greece
- Occupation: Archaeologist
- Title: Ephor General of Antiquities (1864–1884)
- Children: At least one (Michael)
- Awards: Order of the Redeemer, silver cross

Academic background
- Education: University of Athens; Ludwig-Maximilians-Universität München; Friedrich Wilhelm University of Berlin

Academic work
- Institutions: Greek Archaeological Service

Signature
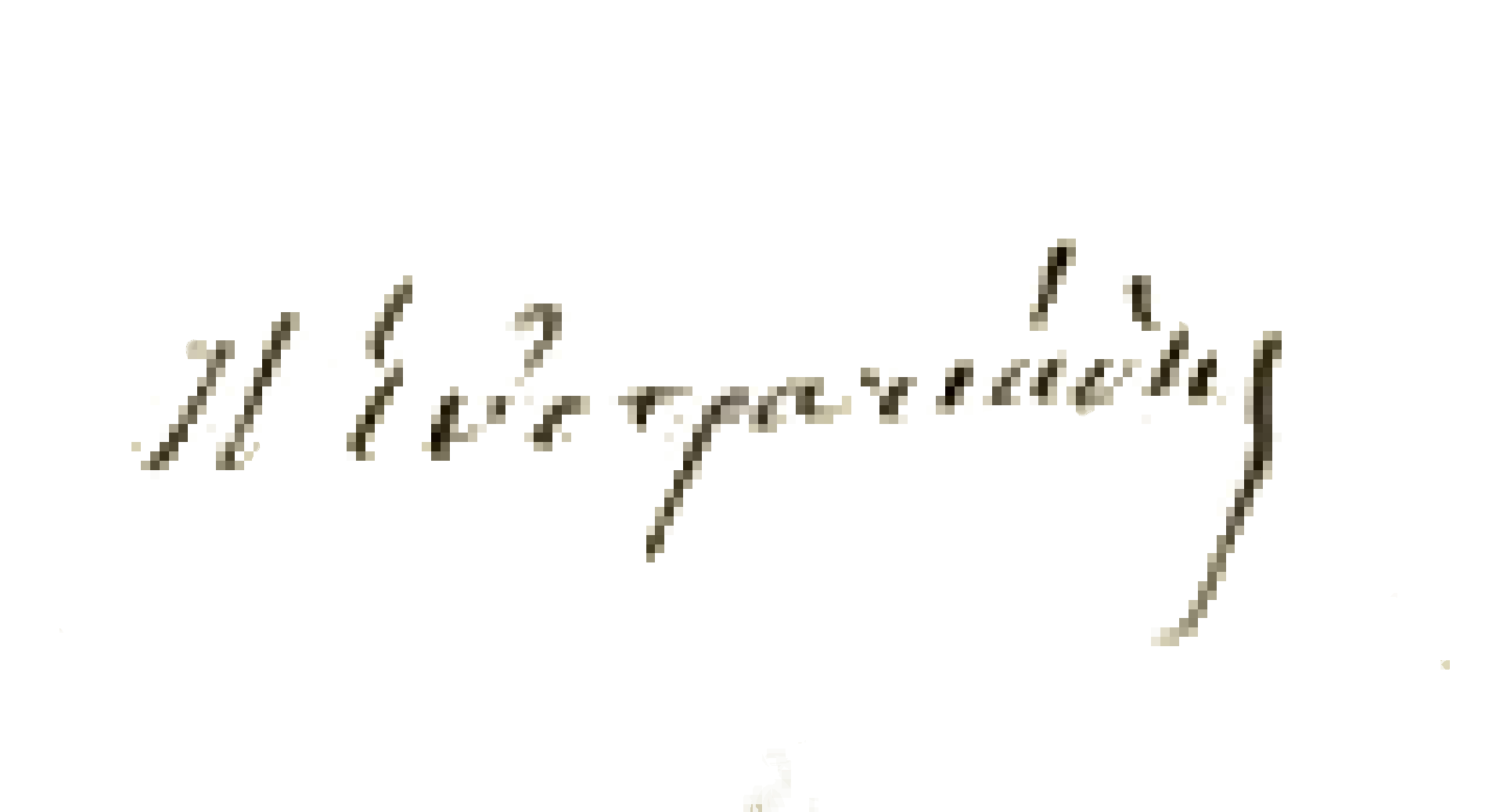

Panagiotis Efstratiadis or Eustratiades (Greek: Παναγιώτης Ευστρατιάδης; 1815 – 7 August [O.S. 26 July] 1888 (Note: Until 1923, Greece used the Julian Calendar, known as the 'Old Style'.)) was a Greek archaeologist. He served as Ephor General of Antiquities, the head of the Greek Archaeological Service, between 1864 and 1884, succeeding Kyriakos Pittakis.

Efstratiadis was born on the Greek island of Lesbos, then part of the Ottoman Empire. He studied archaeology under the prominent epigrapher Ludwig Ross at the University of Athens, and in Germany at the Ludwig-Maximilians-Universität München and the Friedrich Wilhelm University of Berlin. After returning to Greece in 1843, he worked as a teacher alongside his archaeological work for the next twenty years.

He was a founding and prominent member of the Archaeological Society of Athens, a learned society greatly involved in the practice and publication of Greek archaeology throughout the 19th century. From 1851 until 1858, a period of financial trouble for the society, he was one of its few remaining members. He worked alongside Pittakis on the society's excavations of the so-called 'Psoma House' in Athens from 1852, and on its excavations of the Theatre of Dionysus near the Acropolis of Athens between 1861 and 1867. During his tenure as Ephor General, he oversaw the construction of what became the National Archaeological Museum, Athens.

Efstratiadis is remembered for his efforts to protect Greece's archaeological heritage, particularly on the Acropolis of Athens, though his determined efforts to prevent the illegal excavation and export of antiquities were often undercut by the Greek state's limited financial and legal resources to do so. He is also significant for his expansion of the Archaeological Service and his patronage of Panagiotis Stamatakis, who succeeded him as Ephor General and whom he appointed to oversee the excavations of Heinrich Schliemann at Mycenae.

== Early life and career ==
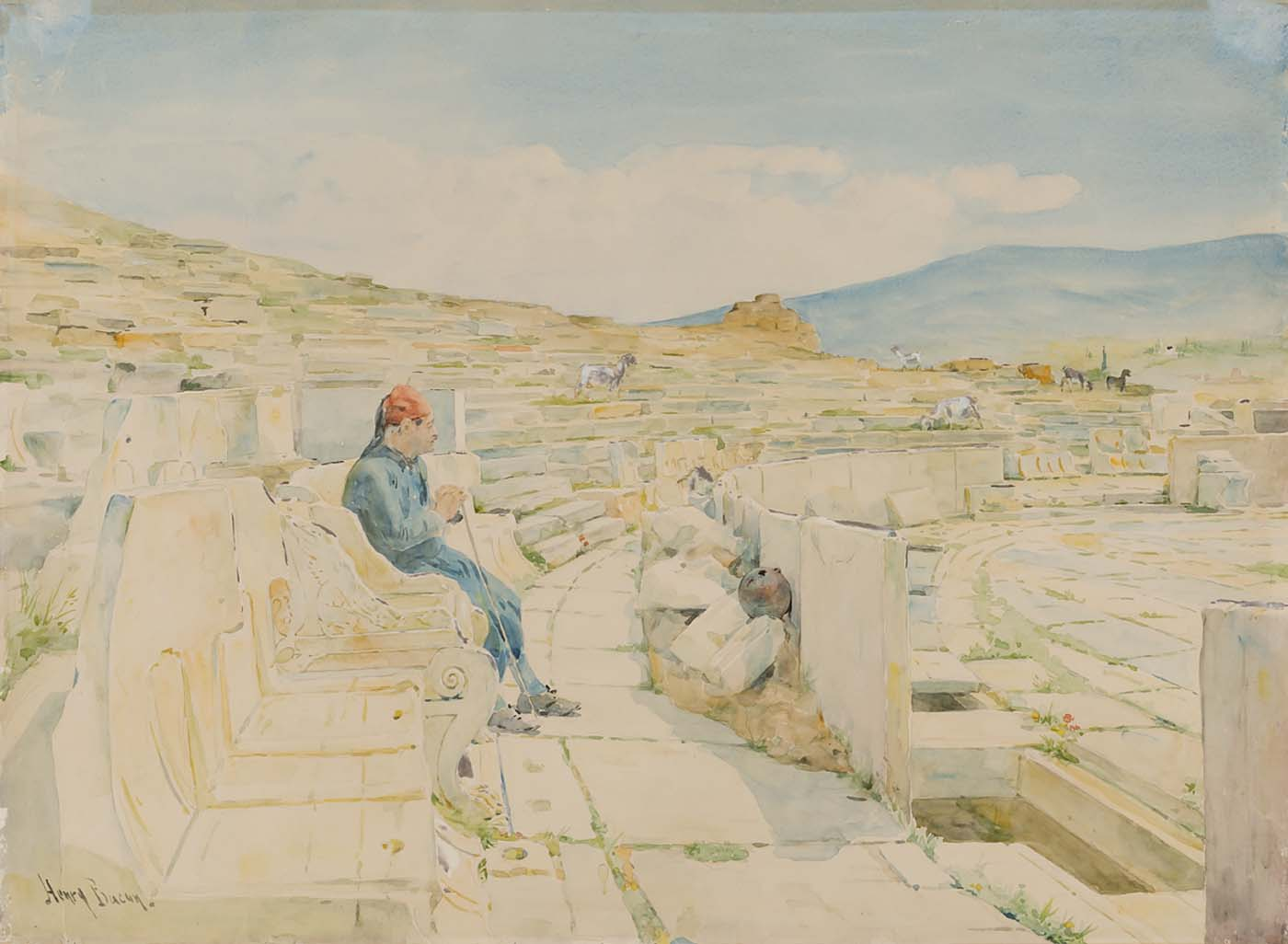
A 1927 painting of the Theatre of Dionysus by the American artist Henry Bacon. Efstratiadis excavated in the theatre between 1861 and 1867.

Panagiotis Efstratiadis was born in the town of Mantamados on the Greek island of Lesbos, then part of the Ottoman Empire, (Note: Lesbos had been under Ottoman control since 1462, and would remain so throughout Efstratiadis' life; it was annexed by Greece in 1912.) in 1815. (Note: Skokos gives the date as November 1813.) He studied at the University of Athens under Ludwig Ross, who had served between 1834 and 1836 as Ephor General of Antiquities, the head of the Greek Archaeological Service. (Note: Petrakos 2011, p. 15. For Ross' tenure as Ephor General, see Fappas 2017) In 1837, Efstratiadis received a government scholarship to study at the Ludwig-Maximilians-Universität München, where he was taught by the classicist and philhellene Friedrich Thiersch, and to read classical philology at the Friedrich Wilhelm University of Berlin. One of his teachers in Berlin was August Böckh, the compiler of the Corpus Inscriptionum Graecarum, a series of publications aiming to collate all known inscriptions from ancient Greece. In Germany, he studied alongside Stefanos Koumanoudis, later described as "the undisputed giant" of Greek epigraphy.

Efstratiadis remained in Germany for six years, returning to Greece in 1843 to work as a teacher. He took his first post in a secondary school (gymnasium) in Nafplio, followed by a position as headmaster of another gymnasium in Athens, which he held until 1863.

== Archaeological Society of Athens ==
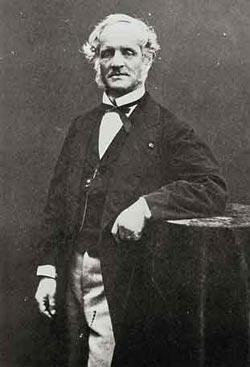
Alexandros Rizos Rangavis, a key figure in the foundation of both the Archaeological Society of Athens and the Archaeological Association

Efstratiadis was a founding member of the Archaeological Society of Athens, a learned society with significant responsibility for archaeological work and heritage management in Greece throughout the nineteenth century. The Society was formed in 1837, largely through the initiative of the self-taught archaeologist Kyriakos Pittakis, the merchant and philanthropist Konstantinos Bellios, the poet Alexandros Rizos Rangavis (who became its first secretary) and the Minister for Education Iakovos Rizos Neroulos, who became its first president. The Society held its first meeting on 10 May [O.S. 28 April] 1837, in the Parthenon.

Efstratiadis was also a founding member in 1848 of the Archaeological Association (Greek: Ἀρχαιολογικὸς Σύλλογος), established by Rangavis as a national academy for Greek science and culture. The association's first publication was accompanied by a letter in Ancient Greek written by Efstratiadis, extolling the contribution of Greeks to the study of the humanities and the role of modern Greeks in communicating epigraphical knowledge to the wider European world. In 1849, Efstratiadis wrote the Ancient Greek text of the Decree of the Benefactors (Greek: Ψήφισμα τῶν Εὐεργετῶν), a pseudo-classical stele erected by the association to honour those who had contributed financially to it. The archaeological historian Nikolaos Papazarkadas has described the stele as "one of the earliest attempts at integrating, however awkwardly, epigraphical knowledge in contemporary cultural practices."

From 1851, following the resignation of Rangavis as its secretary, the Archaeological Society stagnated, having largely run out of money. Efstratiadis became one of Society's few remaining members, serving as vice-secretary and as a member of the board. The society's financial troubles in this period were exacerbated by its 1852 purchase of a house in the Plaka district of Athens, known as the Psoma House after its owner, Louisa Psoma. The purchase was driven by Pittakis, who believed that the house was the site of the bouleuterion (the ancient city's assembly building) and the temples known as the metroon and the tholos, and required the society to raise 12,000 drachmas (Note: Approximately equivalent to €72,400 in 2023, based on conversion rates in Bikelas 1868.) by selling shares it owned in the National Bank of Greece. Efstratiadis assisted Pittakis with the excavation of the site, alongside another member of the society named D. Charamis. The excavation failed to furnish the extensive ancient remains predicted by Pittakis, though it did uncover numerous ancient inscriptions, which Efstratiadis published in three volumes. The archaeologist Konstantinos Kouroniotis later found that the antiquities discovered at the house were associated with the late Roman walls of the city.

Shortly after the society's elections of 23 September [O.S. 11 September] 1852, the society commissioned Efstratiadis, Pittakis, its president Georgios Glakaris, and three architects – Lysandros Kaftanzoglou, Panagis Kalkos and Dimitrios Zezos – to report on the state of the Erechtheion, a temple on the Acropolis of Athens. The Erechtheion had undergone restoration works under Pittakis between 1837 and 1840, a project later described by the archaeological historian Fani Mallouchou-Tufano as characterised by "enthusiasm … innocence, naivety and ignorance", which included the use of improvised material, including tree trunks, to restore the orthostates of the temple.

In April 1854, on the outbreak of the Crimean War, British and French troops occupied Athens' harbour, Piraeus, with the aim of preventing Greece from assisting the Russian Empire against Ottoman Turkey. The occupation led to an outbreak of cholera, which lasted from June 1854 to January 1855 and killed around 3,000 people, including the Archaeological Society's president, Georgios Gennadios. The situation deepened the society's financial crisis such that it effectively ceased to exist until 1858, though Pittakis continued writing and publishing the society's academic journal, the Archaeological Journal (Greek: Αρχαιολογική Εφημερίς, romanized: Archailogiki Efimeris). At the instigation of the Minister for Education, Charalampos Christopoulos, the society reformed in 1858, and was helped in restoring its membership by the collapse of the Archaeological Association, which had folded in 1854. Efstratiadis joined the society's council on its reformation, serving until 1883.

Between 1861 and 1867, Efstratiadis conducted excavations in the Theatre of Dionysus, near the Acropolis of Athens. In 1863, he led the archaeological society's excavations in the Kerameikos cemetery, one of the few places where ancient funerary monuments could be found in situ, owing to the unusual depth at which the site was buried. Efstratidis' work has been praised by the archaeological historian Lena Costaki for his practice of collecting chance finds and expropriating private land when necessary to ensure the coherency of the excavations. His published scholarly output was limited; apart from the publication of the Psoma House inscriptions, he wrote fifteen articles in the Archaeological Journal on epigraphical matters between 1869 and 1874. However, studies of his notebooks and papers in the twenty-first century have revealed important unpublished inscriptions.

== Ephor General of Antiquities ==
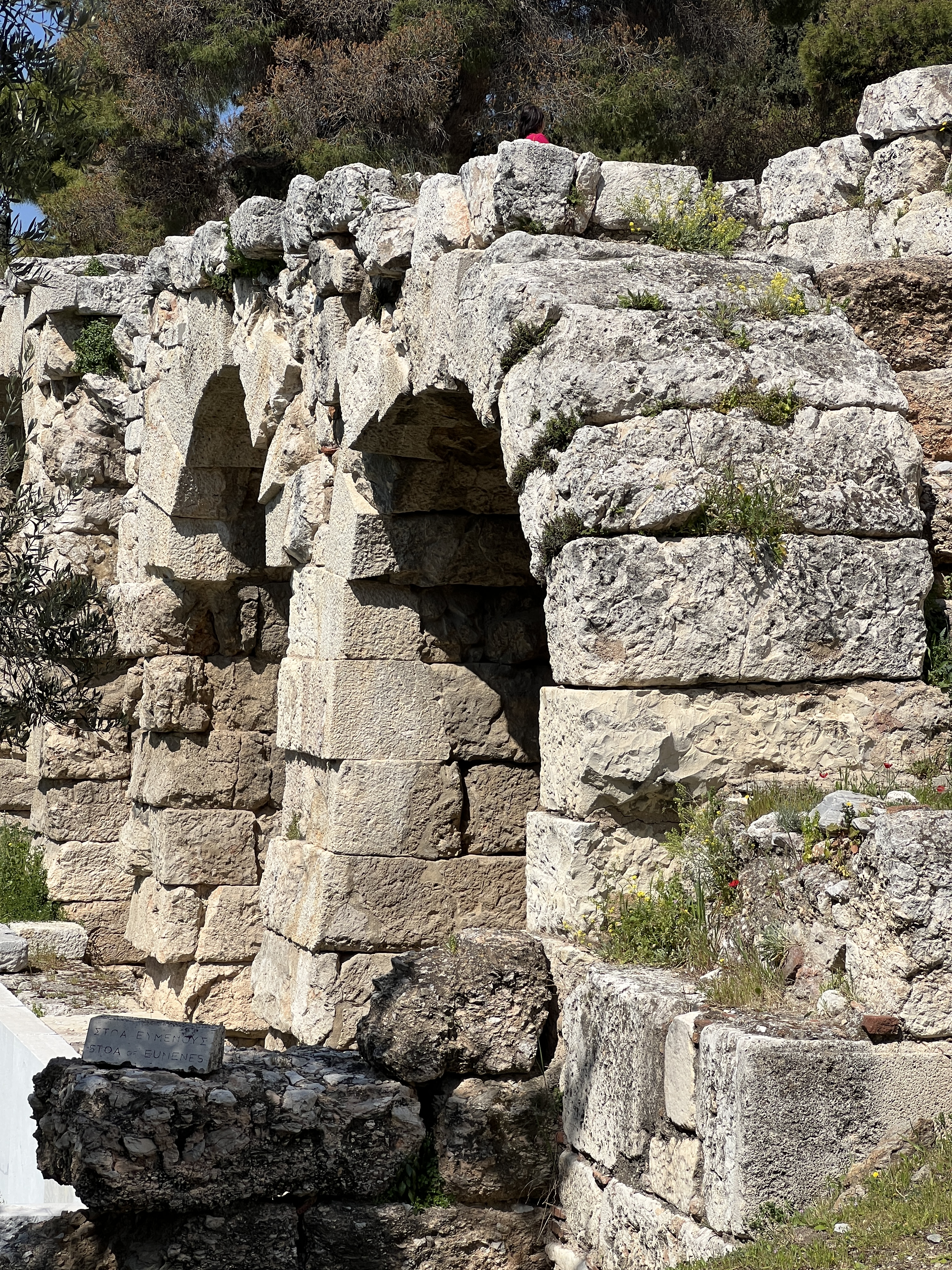
The Stoa of Eumenes on the south slope of the Acropolis of Athens, where Efstratiadis excavated between 1864 and 1865

After the death of Pittakis in 1863, Efstratiadis succeeded him as Ephor General of Antiquities, the head of the Greek Archaeological Service. In an era when few Greek archaeologists worked outside Athens, Efstratiadis took an interest in antiquities throughout Greece: during 1869–1870, he supported the excavation of inscriptions on the island of Euboea, not only following his legal duties as Ephor General in instructing the local prefect and government as to their excavation and conservation, but writing directly to local scholars, mayors and police, asking their help in conducting rescue excavations and in locating finds, protecting them from looting, and transporting them back to Athens. His handwriting from this period has been described as "hasty, nervous and illegible", and as indicative of the strain that Efstratiadis's intense workload placed upon him.

One of Efstratiadis's major responsibilities was the curation and protection of monuments on the Acropolis of Athens. He maintained a daybook of excavations and events on the Acropolis. His entries testify to his struggles with profiteering by those buying the stone blocks taken from the medieval Frankish Tower at the Propylaia, with complaints from local residents that unstable piles of spoil from the excavations were endangering their homes, and with looting of antiquities, as well as the challenges of protecting objects and monuments from weathering once they had been exposed to the elements. He carried out excavations of the Stoa of Eumenes, on the Acropolis's south slope, between 1864 and 1865. Throughout his time as Ephor General, he employed the state's resources to oppose the quarrying of the hills around Athens, which contained valuable archaeological remains, and to expropriate private property to allow excavations, particularly in the Theatre of Dionysus and the Kerameikos.

In 1874, the German businessman and archaeologist Heinrich Schliemann proposed to fund the demolition of the Frankish Tower. Efstratiadis obtained ministerial approval for the project, which would be carried out by the Archaeological Society, though the final removal of the tower was delayed until 1875 by administrative reluctance and the personal intervention of King George. The demolition was controversial: due to the tower's origins in Athens's period of foreign rule, (Note: The date and circumstances of the tower's construction are unclear: it is likely to have been constructed by the Frankish and Florentine dukes who ruled Athens between 1205 and 1458. Nineteenth-century observers also hypothesised that it may have been constructed by the Venetians or the Ottoman Turks.) it was widely viewed within Greece as an intrusion on the earlier Greek remains of the Acropolis, though commentators from the rest of Europe valued the tower for its aesthetic appeal and as a symbol of the continuity between ancient Greek and western European culture. Schliemann's actions were widely criticised outside Greece, though Archaeological Society defended them as a means of "the restoration of the Greek character of the shining face of the Acropolis, pure and unsullied by anything foreign". (Note: The Society's representatives, Stephanos Koumanoudis and Lysandros Kaftantzoglou, quoted in Mallouchou-Tufano 2007, p. 50)

In July 1866, Efstratiadis hired Panagiotis Stamatakis, then aged around twenty and with no formal archaeological education, as his personal assistant. When Schliemann was granted permission by the Greek government in 1874 to excavate at Mycenae, Efstratiadis insisted that Stamatakis should accompany the excavations as the state's overseer and representative. Efstratiadis was highly suspicious of Schliemann, and remained in continuous contact with Stamatakis by letter throughout the excavations, which eventually took place in 1876.

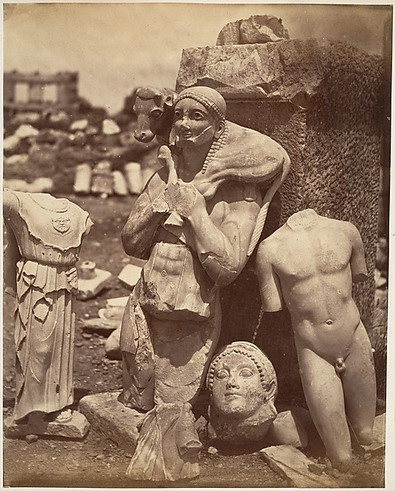
Works of Greek statuary discovered in 1865 during the construction of the Old Acropolis Museum, including the Kritios Boy (far right, missing head) and the Moschophoros (centre)

Efstratiadis's handling of Schliemann's case mirrored his earlier treatment, in January 1866, of the art dealers Grigorios Bournias and Ioannis Palaiologos, who had asked permission to excavate in the Profitis Ilias area of Athens. Efstratiadis noted that the law obliged him to grant permission, as the excavation was on private land and the landowner's consent had been given, but insisted that the excavation should take place under strict supervision. Efstratiadis also opposed the removal of antiquities from Greece: in 1867, he denounced the epigrapher and art dealer Athanasios Rhousopoulos for selling the so-called Aineta aryballos to the British Museum, calling him "university professor, antiquities looter". Efstratiadis eventually ensured that Rhousopoulos was fined 1,000 drachmas (the same as the price for which he had sold the aryballos) for the sale, but he was restricted by the need to retain good relations with the art dealers of Athens, who undertook more excavations in this period than either the Archaeological Society or the Archaeological Service and usually offered to sell the artefacts they uncovered to the state. Furthermore, the state had limited legal powers to respond to the illegal export of antiquities. In 1873, for example, Efstratiadis noted in his records the illegal export by the art dealer Anastasios Erneris of a series of funerary plaques, painted by Exekias, to the German archaeologist Gustav Hirschfeld, but was unable to prevent or reverse the sale. The archaeologist and archaeological historian Yannis Galanakis has judged that the limited financial and legal resources available to Efstratiadis, as well as the lack of political will to assist him on the part of the Greek state, meant that his goal of controlling the illegal excavation and trade of antiquities was "impossible to achieve".

Other major projects of his period as Ephor General included the construction of the Old Acropolis Museum between 1865 and 1874. The building necessitated excavations in the northern and north-eastern parts of the Acropolis: excavations here of the so-called Perserschutt (the ceremonial dump into which the Athenians had placed the remains of the Persian destruction of the Acropolis in 480 BCE) brought to light many notable works of ancient sculpture. He also oversaw the construction of the Central Museum under the architect Panagis Kalkos, (Note: Since 1881, the museum has been known as the National Archaeological Museum.) which began in October 1866; after numerous delays due to financial limitations and political instability, the museum's west wing opened to the public in 1881.

Efstratiadis's tenure as Ephor General saw the foundation of the German Archaeological Institute at Athens in 1874 and its first excavations at Olympia from 1875–1881, as well as the beginnings of the excavation of Eleusis in 1882 under the Archaeological Society of Athens. He also oversaw the beginning of the expansion of the Archaeological Service, which had previously consisted entirely of the Ephor General. In 1879, Panagiotis Kavvadias was recruited as an ephor, followed by Konstantinos Dimitriadis in 1881 and by five further appointments in 1883 and 1885, including those of Christos Tsountas and Valerios Stais. This expansion continued throughout the next two decades, providing the core of the service's twentieth-century administrative apparatus.

Efstratiadis retired as Ephor General in 1884, and was succeeded by his protégé Stamatakis. He died in Athens on 7 August [O.S. 26 July] 1888.

== Personal life ==
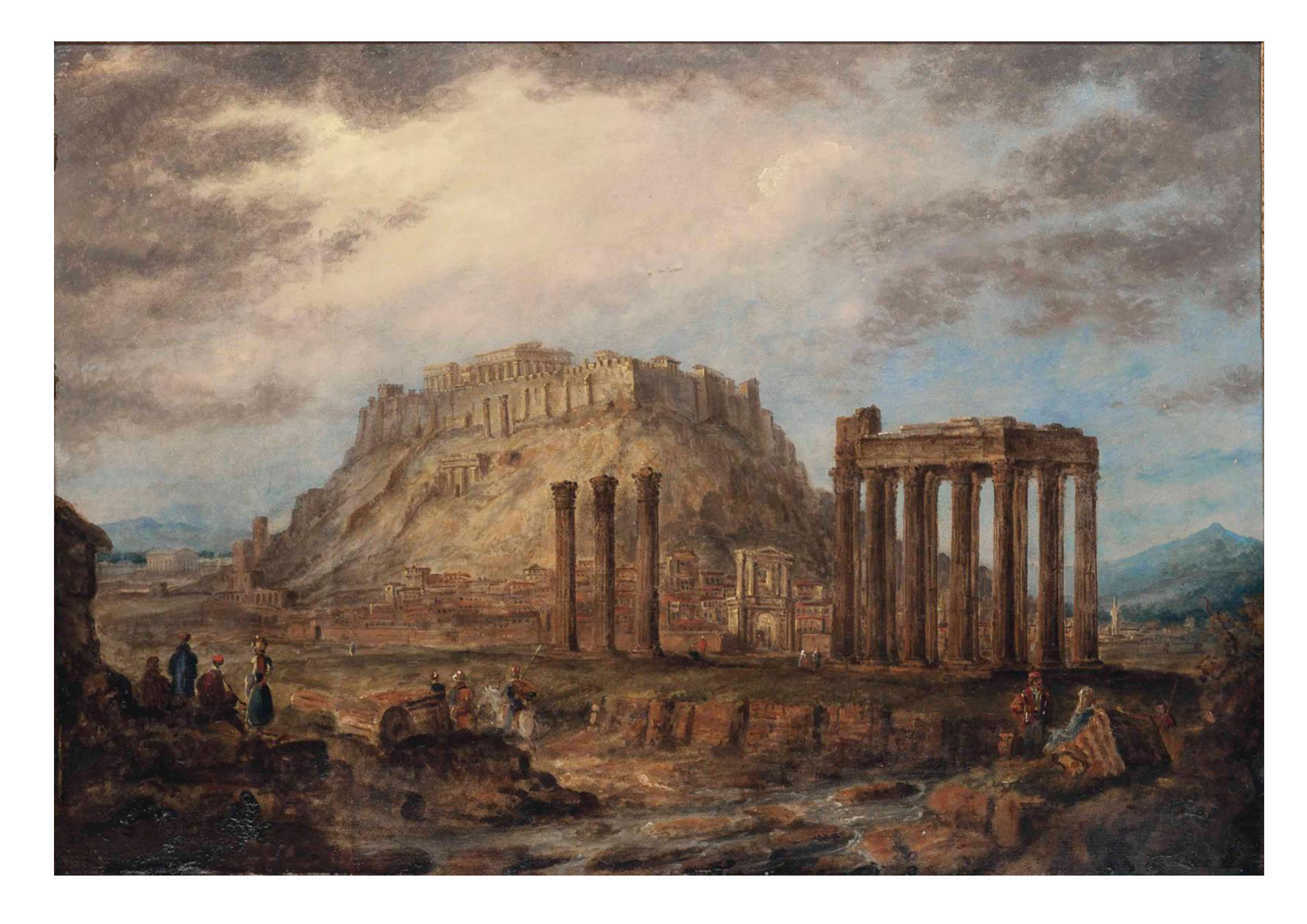
View of the Acropolis of Athens from the Temple of Olympian Zeus, painted c. 1830

Little is known of Efstratiadis's private and family life. His son, Michael, became a lawyer and donated a cache of Panagiotis' papers to the Archaeological Society of Athens in 1932.

In person, Efstratiadis was known to be meticulous, independent and highly protective of the antiquities in his care. His contemporary, the Greek writer Konstantinos Skokos, described him as "always moderate, self-sufficient [and] faithful to his duty". He was also introverted, private and withdrawn: no known image or photograph of him survives. An 1882 letter from Stefanos Koumanoudis reveals something of his character:

Dear Mr. Giannopoulos,
Three days ago, when you suggested the climb up the Acropolis to me, I declined it as well … I most greatly want to avoid this climb, because I can see nothing good that will come of it. Mr. Efstratiadis will be tempted, I think, to take our completely natural and innocent visit as something else altogether – as an act of espionage. I have this idea because I have known him for a long time, and he is a suspicious man … Don't you notice that the excavation started months ago … and he has not said anything about it at the meetings of the Council? I noticed that, because I know his habits from many years' experience. He does not want anyone to interfere in his work.

Efstratiadis maintained a friendly correspondence with his former teacher, August Böckh, and sought his advice on behalf of the Archaeological Society in 1851 over the reading of an inscription, now known to be from the base of the Phrasikleia Kore. (Note: The kore statue itself was discovered and associated with the base inscription in 1972.) In the same year, he wrote to Ludwig Ross, who had been dismissed from his professorship at Athens following the 3 September 1843 Revolution, which had forced King Otto to remove Ross and most of his fellow northern Europeans from public service. Ross sent Efstratiadis what Petrakos has termed an "affectionate and laudatory" reply.

== Honours and legacy ==
According to an 1889 obituary, Efstratiadis was considered the foremost Greek epigrapher of his day. He was awarded the Order of Merit of the Prussian Crown, and elected as both a corresponding member of the Academy of Sciences in Berlin and a member of the German Archaeological Institute at Rome. In 1868, he was awarded the silver cross (the lowest grade, also known as knight) of the Greek Order of the Redeemer, Greece's national order of merit.

Efstratiadis was considered a key figure in the foundation of the National Archaeological Museum of Athens. Skokos judged that the museum "would undoubtedly not exist without [Efstratiadis's] tireless efforts." In 2021, Costaki described him as one of the "founding fathers" of Greek archaeology, alongside Pittakis and Koumanoudis.

A conference in Efstratiadis's memory was held at the National Archaeological Museum of Athens in December 2015, hosted by the Greek Epigraphical Society (Greek: Ελληνική Επιγραφική Εταιρεία).

== Bibliography ==
- Alysandratou, Maria (2015), Greek Committee of Byzantine Studies: Newsletter (PDF), archived from the original (PDF) on 23 December 2022
- Antoniadis, Vyron; Kouremenos, Anna (2021). "Selective Memory and the Legacy of Archaeological Figures in Contemporary Athens: The Case of Heinrich Schliemann and Panagiotis Stamatakis". The Historical Review/La Revue Historique. 17: 181–204. doi:10.12681/hr.27071. hdl:10442/18299. S2CID 238067293.
- Archaeological Society of Athens (2020a). Γραμματειες Σκαρλατου Βυζαντιου (1851–1852) και Κυριακου Πιττακη (1852–1859) [Secretariat of Skarlatos Byzantios (1851–1852) and Kyriakos Pittakis (1852–1859)] (PDF). Archaeological Society of Athens (in Greek). Archived from the original (PDF) on 16 July 2020.
- Archaeological Society of Athens (1937). Λεύκωμα της εκατονταετηρίδος της Εν Αθήναις Αρχαιολογικής Εταιρείας [Album of the Centenary of the Archaeological Society of Athens] (in Greek). Athens. OL 35351399W. Archived from the original on 23 April 2023.
- Bikelas, Demetrius (1868). "Statistics of the Kingdom of Greece". Journal of the Statistical Society of London. 31 (3): 265–298. doi:10.2307/2338853. JSTOR 2338853.
- Brinkmann, Vinzenz; Koch-Brinkmann, Ulrike; Piening, Heinrich (2010). "The Funerary Monument of Phrasikleia". In Brinkmann, Vinzenz; Primavesi, Oliver; Hollein, Max (eds.). Circumlitio: The Polychromy of Antique and Mediaeval Sculpture. Munich: Hirmer Verlag. pp. 188–217. ISBN 978-3-7774-2871-0.
- Chatzidimitriou, Athina (2021). Ο Π. Ευστρατιάδης μεριμνά για τις ευβοϊκές αρχαιότητες: Aπό την διοικητική αλληλογραφία των ετών 1869–1870 [P. Efstratiadis Takes Care of the Euboean Antiquities: From the Administrative Correspondence of the Years 1869–1870]. In Matthiaou, Angelos; Chatzidimitriou, Athina (eds.). Πρακτικά Συμποσίου εις μνήμην Παναγιώτου Ευστρατιάδου (1815–1888) (in Greek). Athens: Greek Epigraphical Society. pp. 119–142. OL 35351400W.
- Christopoulou, Alexandra (2011). Εθνικo αρχαιολογικo μουσεiο και νεoτερη Ελλαδα: παράλληλες ιστορίες [National Archaeological Museum and Modern Greece: Parallel Histories] (PDF). Αρχαιολογια και Τεχνες (in Greek). 113: 5–10. Archived from the original (PDF) on 20 March 2023.
- Costaki, Lena (2021). "Urban Archaeology: Discovering the Ancient City". In Neils, Jenifer; Rogers, Dylan K. (eds.). The Cambridge Companion to Ancient Athens. Cambridge: Cambridge University Press. pp. 462–481. doi:10.1017/9781108614054. ISBN 978-1-108-61405-4. S2CID 243691800.
- Diakoumakou, Maria S. (2019). Το αδημοσίευτο Αρχείο του Παναγιώτη Eυστρατιάδη, Γενικού Eφόρου Αρχαιοτήτων 1864–1884 [The Unpublished Archive of Panagiotis Efstratiadis, Ephor General of Antiquities] (M.A. thesis) (in Greek). National and Kapodistrian University of Athens.
- Dickinson, O.T.P.K. (1976). "Schliemann and the Shaft Graves". Greece and Rome. 23 (2): 159–168. doi:10.1017/S0017383500019161. JSTOR 642224. S2CID 162408938.
- Dyson, Stephen L. (2008). In Pursuit of Ancient Pasts: A History of Classical Archaeology in the Nineteenth and Twentieth Centuries. New Haven: Yale University Press. ISBN 978-0-300-13497-1.
- Fappas, Ioannis (2017). "Archaeology Through Archives: The Early History of the Archaeological Research in Boeotia Through Original Historical Archives". CHS Research Bulletin. 5 (2). Archived from the original on 29 April 2023.
- Galanakis, Yannis; Nowak-Kemp, Malgosia (2013). "Ancient Greek skulls in the Oxford University Museum, Part II: The Rhousopoulos–Rolleston correspondence". Journal of the History of Collections. 25 (1): 1–17. doi:10.1093/jhc/fhq040.
- Galanakis, Yannis; Skaltsa, Stella (2012). "Tomb robbers, art dealers, and a dikast's pinakion from an Athenian grave". Hesperia. 81 (4): 619–653. doi:10.2972/hesperia.81.4.0619. JSTOR 10.2972/hesperia.81.4.0619. S2CID 163987166.
- Galanakis, Yannis (2011). "An Unpublished Stirrup Jar from Athens and the 1871–2 Private Excavations in the Outer Kerameikos". Annual of the British School at Athens. 106: 167–200. doi:10.1017/S0068245411000074. JSTOR 41721707. S2CID 162544324.
- Giochalas, Thanasis; Kafetzaki, Tonia (2013). Αθήνα. Ιχνηλατώντας την πόλη με οδηγό την ιστορία και τη λογοτεχνία [Athens. Tracing the city through history and literature] (in Greek). Athens: Estia. ISBN 978-960-05-1559-6.
- Jenkins, Ian (1990). "Acquisition and Supply of Casts of the Parthenon Sculptures by the British Museum, 1835–1939". The Annual of the British School at Athens. 85: 89–114. doi:10.1017/S0068245400015598. JSTOR 30102843. S2CID 193237324.
- Kalogeropoulos, Konstantinos (2021). "Vasileios Petrakos: A Life Dedicated to the Service of Greek Archaeology". In Vassilikou, Dora; Kalogeropoulos, Konstantinos; Tiverios, Michalis (eds.). Sidelights on Greek Antiquity: Archaeological and Epigraphical Essays in Honour of Vasileios Petrakos. Berlin/Boston: De Gruyter. pp. xxiii–lxxviii. ISBN 978-3-11-069932-6.
- Kiminas, Demetrius (2009). The Ecumenical Patriarchate. San Bernardino: The Borgo Press. ISBN 978-1-4344-5876-6.
- Konstantinidi-Syvridi, Eleni; Paschalidis, Constantinos (2019). "The Unacknowledged Panayotis Stamatakis and his Invaluable Contribution to the Understanding of Grave Circle A at Mycenae". Archaeological Reports. 65: 111–126. JSTOR 26867451.
- Lock, Peter (1986). "The Frankish Towers of Central Greece". The Annual of the British School at Athens. 81: 101–123. doi:10.1017/S0068245400020104. S2CID 129263771.
- Mallouchou-Tufano, Fani (2007). "The Vicissitudes of the Athenian Acropolis in the Nineteenth Century: From Castle to Monument". In Valavanis, Panos (ed.). Great Moments in Greek Archaeology. Athens: Kapon Press. pp. 36–57. ISBN 978-0-89236-910-2.
- Mandamadiotou, Maria (2014). "The Greek Orthodox Community of Mytilene: From the Multiethnic Symbiosis in the Ottoman Empire to the Greek State, 1908–1912". In Biagini, Antonello (ed.). Empires and Nations from the Eighteenth to the Twentieth Century. Vol. 2. Newcastle-upon-Tyne: Cambridge Scholars Publishing. pp. 200–210. ISBN 978-1-4438-6542-5.
- Malouchou, G.E. (2012). "Two Overlooked Attic Inscriptions". In Martzavou, Paraskevi; Papazarkadas, Nikolaos (eds.). Epigraphical Approaches to the Post-Classical Polis. Oxford: Oxford University Press. pp. 201–216. ISBN 978-0-19-965214-3.
- Masouridi, Stavroula (2013). 1863–1885: Περίοδος Π. Ευστρατιάδη και Π. Σταματάκη [1863–1885: Period of P. Efstratiatis and P. Stamatakis]. In Kontouri, Elena; Masouridi, Stavroula (eds.). Ιστορίες επί χάρτου: Μορφές και θέματα της Αρχαιολογίας στην Ελλάδα του 19ου αιώνα [Histories on Paper: Modalities and Themes of Archaeology in Greece in the Nineteenth Century] (PDF) (in Greek). Athens: Ministry of Culture and Sport. pp. 22–27. ISBN 978-960-386-138-6. Archived from the original (PDF) on 22 May 2023.
- Oikomenos, Georgios (1932). Γενικὴ ἔκθεσις τοῦ Γραμματέως περὶ τῶν πεπραγμένων [General Report of the Secretary on the Proceedings] (PDF). Proceedings of the Archaeological Society of Athens (in Greek). 87: 1–26. Archived from the original (PDF) on 22 September 2022.
- Papazarkadas, Nikolaos (2014). "Epigraphy in Early Modern Greece". Journal of the History of Collections. 26 (3): 399–412. doi:10.1093/jhc/fhu018.
- Petrakos, Vasileios (1987). Η Εν Αθήναις Αρχαιολογική Εταιρεία: η ιστορία των 150 χρόνων της [The Archaeological Society of Athens: The History of its 150 Years] (in Greek). Athens: Archaeological Society of Athens. OL 47767071M.
- Petrakos, Vasileios (1988). Παναγιώτης Εὐστρατιάδης 1815–1888 [Panagiotis Efstratiadis 1815–1888] (PDF). Mentor. 1 (1): 18–19.
- Petrakos, Vasileios (2007a). "The Stages of Greek Archaeology". In Valavanis, Panos (ed.). Great Moments in Greek Archaeology. Athens: Kapon Press. pp. 16–35. ISBN 978-0-89236-910-2.
- Petrakos, Vasileios (2007b). Ὁ Ἀρχαιολογικὸς Σύλλογος. Ἡ πρώτη ἀκαδημία στὴν ἐλευθερωμένη Ἑλλάδα, 1848–1854 [The Archaeological Association. The First Academy in Liberated Greece, 1848–1854] (in Greek). Athens: Archaeological Society of Athens. OL 47767072M.
- Petrakos, Vasileios (2011). Η εν Αθήναις Αρχαιολογική Εταιρεία. Οι Αρχαιολόγοι και οι Ανασκαφές 1837–2011 (Κατάλογος Εκθέσεως) [The Archaeological Society of Athens. The Archaeologists and the Excavations 1837–2011 (Exhibition Catalogue)] (in Greek). Athens: Archaeological Society of Athens. ISBN 978-960-8145-86-3.
- Phlerianou, Aikaterini (1999). Χαρίλαος Τρικούπης: η ζωή και το έργο του [Charilaos Trikoupis: His Life and Work] (in Greek). Athens: Hellenic Parliament. ISBN 978-960-560-027-3.
- Presidency of the Hellenic Republic (24 April 2020). "Order of the Redeemer". Archived from the original on 10 March 2018.
- Skokos, Konstantinos (1889). "Βιογραφικαί σημειώσεις" . Ἐτήσιον Ἡμερολόγιον τοῦ Ἔτους 1889 (in Greek). Athens: Anestis Konstantinou. pp. 388–400 – via Wikisource.
- Sotiropoulos, Michalis (2022). Liberalism after the Revolution: The Intellectual Foundations of the Greek State, c.1830–1880. Cambridge: Cambridge University Press. ISBN 978-1-009-25465-6.
- St. Clair, William (2022). St Clair, David; Barnes, Lucy (eds.). Who Saved the Parthenon? A New History of the Acropolis Before, During and After the Greek Revolution (PDF). Cambridge: Open Book Publishers. doi:10.11647/OBP.0136. ISBN 978-1-78374-461-9. S2CID 248842303. Archived from the original (PDF) on 27 May 2022.
- Tucker, Spencer C. (2009). A Global Chronology of Conflict. Santa Barbara: ABC-CLIO. p. 1210. ISBN 978-1-85109-672-5.
- Vasilikou, Dora (2006). Οι ανασκαφές της Αρχαιολογικής Εταιρείας στις Κυκλάδες, 1872–1910 [The Excavations of the Archaeological Society in the Cyclades, 1972–1910] (in Greek). Athens: Archaeological Society of Athens. ISBN 978-960-8145-55-9.
- Vasilikou, Dora (2011). Το χρονικό της ανασκαφής των Μυκηνών, 1870–1878 [The Chronicle of the Excavation of Mycenae, 1870–1878] (PDF) (in Greek). Athens: Archaeological Society of Athens. ISBN 978-960-8145-87-0. Archived from the original (PDF) on 7 December 2022.

Preceded by Kyriakos Pittakis	Ephor-General of Antiquities; 1864-1884	Succeeded by Panagiotis Stamatakis
