= Panayotov =

Panayotov (Bulgarian: Панайотов) is a surname. Notable people with the surname include:

- Aleksandr Panayotov (born 1984), Ukrainian singer-songwriter
- Aleksandr Panayotov Aleksandrov (born 1951), Bulgarian cosmonaut
- Georgi Velikov Panayotov (born 1968), Bulgarian diplomat
- Mincho Panayotov (1944–2025), Bulgarian painter
- Panayot Panayotov (1930–1996), Bulgarian footballer
- Plamen Panayotov (born 1958), Bulgarian politician and academic
- Vasil Panayotov (born 1990), Bulgarian footballer
- Vladko Panayotov (born 1950), Bulgarian politician

== See also ==
- Panayot (disambiguation)
