= Panayot =

Panayot (Bulgarian: Панайот, Albanian: Panajot) is a name derived from the Greek Panagiotis. The Romanian equivalent is Panait.

Panayot may refer to:

== People ==
- Panayot Butchvarov (1933–2026), Bulgarian-born American philosopher and academic
- Panayot Cherna (1881–1913), Romanian writer and academic
- Panayot Hitov (1830–1918), Bulgarian revolutionary
- Panayot Panayotov (footballer) (1930–1996), Bulgarian football forward
- Panayot Pipkov, (1871–1942) Bulgarian composer
- Panayot Volov, pseudonym of Petar Vankov, Bulgarian revolutionary
- Panajot Pano (born Panagiotis Panou, 1939–2010), Albanian football player

== Places ==
- Panayot Volovo, Shumen Municipality, Bulgaria
- Panayot Hitovo, Omurtag Municipality, Bulgaria

== See also ==
- Panayot Volov Stadium, multi-use stadium in Shumen, Bulgaria
- PFC Panayot Volov, a Bulgarian football club, playing in the city of Shumen
- Panayotov, a surname derived from the name
