= Panai =

Panai may refer to:

- Panai Kongpraphan (b. 1983), Thai footballer
- Panai (Taiwanese singer)
- Panai, Iran
- Panai Kingdom on the northern coast of Sumatra in the Srivijaya period. Nearby sites were Barus and Lamuri. (See also: historic map detailing location)
