= Gavrail Panchev =

Gavrail Panchev (born 15 October 1954 in Stamboliyski) is a Bulgarian author, researcher and publicist. In 1982, Gavrail Panchev acquired his master's degree in Bulgarian philology at Plovdiv University "Paisiy Hilendarski". Between 1983 and 1991 he worked consecutively as teacher and assistant director in High school "Father Paisiy" in Stamboliyski town. Gavrail Panchev was director of foundation "European month of culture" in Plovdiv city. Since 10 November 1989 he has published multitude articles in the Bulgarian national press (newspaper "Democracy", "Philosophical alternatives" magazine, newspaper Literatural forum, Democratic review magazine, newspaper Marica and others). Gavrail Panchev is author of eight books (Author and eight books (Between the slavery and the freedom, The change and others). His newest work, Biography of Aleko Konstantinov in three volumes is assessed by the Bulgarian Academy of Sciences as the best research on the life of the prominent Bulgarian social and literature figure.

== Publications ==
- 1993: Komunizmŭt kato komunizŭm. Poligraf
- 1994: Zwischen Sklaverei und Freiheit (translated from the Bulgarian "Между робството и свободата"; Mezhdu robstwoto i svobodata)
- 1994: Die Veränderung (translated from the Bulgarian "Промяната"; Promyanata)
- 1997: Ubiistvoto na Aleko Konstantinov. Literaturen forum; ISBN 954-8121-85-9.
- 2003: Aleko Konstantinov - Biografia 1
- 2003: Aleko Konstantinov - Biografia 2
- 2008: Aleko Konstantinov - Biografia 3
