= Panagiota Fatourou =

Greek computer scientist

Panagiota (Youla) Fatourou (Greek: Παναγιώτα Φατούρου) is a Greek computer scientist, specializing in distributed computing and concurrent computing, including the design of data structures that can be used in non-blocking algorithms. She is a professor of computer science at the University of Crete, the former chair of the ACM Europe Council, and the founder of the Greek chapter of the ACM Council on Women in Computing.

== Education and career ==
Fatourou was born in Kalamata. She earned a degree in computer science from the University of Crete in 1995, and completed her Ph.D. in 1999 at the University of Patras, under the supervision of Paul Spirakis.

After postdoctoral research with Kurt Mehlhorn at the Max Planck Institute for Informatics and with Faith Ellen at the University of Toronto, and a short-term position at the Hellenic Open University, she worked at the University of Ioannina from 2001 until 2009. She moved to her present position at the University of Crete in 2009, and is now a full professor there.

In 2018, Fatourou became founding chair of the Greek chapter of the ACM Council on Women in Computing. She was chair of the ACM Europe Council for the 2019–2021 term.

== Recognition ==
Fatourou was an ACM Distinguished Speaker for 2016–2019.
