= Panagiota Klentrou =

Kinesiology professor

Panagiota "Nota" Klentrou is a professor at Brock University known for her research on sport training in children. She is an elected fellow of the Canadian Society for Exercise Physiology.

== Early life and education ==
Klentrou was born and raised in Athens, Greece. She received a B.Sc. (1981) in Physical Education and Sport Science from the National and Kapodistrian University of Athens, and an MSc (1987) and PhD (1991) in Exercise Physiology from the University of Montréal, Québec, Canada. Klentrou joined Brock University in 1996 as an assistant professor and was promoted to professor in 2007. Klentrou has served as the chair of the department of kinesiology at Brock University (2006-2011 and 2020–2025), and the associate dean (2011–2020). Since July 2025, Klentrou has been the Dean of the Faculty of Applied Health Sciences at Brock University

Klentrou served as president of the Canadian Society for Exercise Physiology from 2017 to 2019 after having served as treasurer of the Society for 10 years (2023–2013).

== Research ==
Klentrou's research uses applied and basic science approaches to study human performance and the implications of sport training primarily in children and youth. This includes investigations into how sexual maturation, exercise, inflammation, immune responses, adiposity and nutrition affect musculoskeletal growth and development. This research is trying to identify the cellular mechanisms that explain how exercise training and dietary choices during childhood and adolescence affects lifelong bone health. Her research has connected intensive training for gymnastics with amenorrhea in women and examined bone health and recovery after exercise. She has also presented educational opportunities possible for training in rhythmic gymnastics.

== Selected publications ==
- Bell, M., Narciso, P. H., Baker, E., Falk, B., Roy, B. D., Josse, A. R., & Klentrou, P. (2025). Effects of Greek Yogurt Supplementation and Exercise on Markers of Bone Turnover and Inflammation in Older Adult Exercisers: An 8-Week Pilot Intervention Trial. Nutrients, 17(24), 3902. https://doi.org/10.3390/nu17243902
- Narciso, P.H., von Ah Morano, A.E., Agostinete, R.R. et al. Cytokine and adipokine response following high-intensity interval running and cycling in female adolescents. Eur J Appl Physiol 125, 3543–3552 (2025). https://doi.org/10.1007/s00421-025-05851-w
- Theocharidis, A., McKinlay, B.J., Vlachopoulos, D. et al. Effects of post exercise protein supplementation on markers of bone turnover in adolescent swimmers. J Int Soc Sports Nutr 17, 20 (2020). https://doi.org/10.1186/s12970-020-00350-z
- Kouvelioti, R.; Kurgan, N.; Falk, B.; Ward, W.E.; Josse, A.R.; Klentrou, P. Cytokine and Sclerostin Response to High-Intensity Interval Running versus Cycling. Medicine & Science in Sports & Exercise 51(12):p 2458–2464, December 2019. | DOI: 10.1249/MSS.0000000000002076
- Klentrou P, Plyley M (2003). "Onset of puberty, menstrual frequency and body fat in elite rhythmic gymnasts versus normal controls". British Journal of Sports Medicine. 37 (6): 490–494. doi:10.1136/bjsm.37.6.490. PMC 1724701. PMID 14665585.
- Behm, David G.; Faigenbaum, Avery D.; Falk, Baraket; Klentrou, Panagiota (2008). "Canadian Society for Exercise Physiology position paper: resistance training in children and adolescents". Applied Physiology, Nutrition, and Metabolism. 33 (3): 547–561. doi:10.1139/h08-020. hdl:10464/6946. ISSN 1715-5312. PMID 18461111.

== Awards and honors ==
In 2020, Klentrou was named a fellow of the Canadian Society for Exercise Physiology. In 2023, Klentrou was awarded the prestigious CSEP Honour Award . Klentrou was recognized for her research by Brock University with the honorary Distinguished Professor designation.

== Personal life ==
Klentrou was a member of Greece's national team of Rhythmic Gymnastics, and placed sixth in ribbon and seventh in clubs during the 1983 Balkan Games in Serres, Greece.
