= Christiane Lüth =

Danish-German diarist

Christiane Lüth (1817–1900) was a Danish-German diarist. She is known for her diary, regarded as a valuable source on the Greek Royal court under King Otto.

== Life ==
Lüth was born on Nordsjælland, the daughter of the Danish official Heinr. Fr. Georg Fischer (1781–1829) and Mette Elisabeth Petersen (1789–1857), and raised in Fredensborg.

As an adult, Lüth became a governess for a rich family in Holstein. In 1838, she married A. H. F. Lüth (1806–1859), a Lutheran German priest from the Duchy of Oldenburg who worked for the same family she worked for.

=== Greece ===
In 1839, Lüth's spouse was appointed personal chaplain of the queen of Greece, Amalia of Oldenburg, and the couple moved to Greece together with her unmarried sister Johanne ("Hanne") Fischer. She and her husband lived at the royal court in Athens from 1839 until May 1852.

In 1842, her little son Nikolai was used to provide for the smallpox inoculation performed by the royal physician Rosen on the queen, who demanded all her ladies-in-waitings be subjected to it before it was performed on her.

In 1843, many German soldiers were relieved of their position. Lüth described how the Catholic Germans appealed to the king's Catholic chaplain for help while the Protestant Germans appealed to the queen's Lutheran chaplain (Lüth), but both categories expected the king to show solidarity with them because he was German: "... they would much rather remain here, were there was a German King, who in their opinion should see to the need of his [German] countrymen first. They simply did not understand his position in this country."

After the 3 September 1843 Revolution, many of the Germans were sent back to Germany by the king out of concern for the Greek opposition, but the Lüth couple's position was not touched, because the queen's chaplain belonged to the private staff of the royal household and was not on state salary. Christiane Lüth wished to return to Denmark, but the queen did not wish to lose her chaplain and did not provide him with a reference, and they remained in Greece for several years longer.

=== Later life ===
In 1852, Lüth's spouse left his service and she returned with him to Germany, were they settled in Lübeck. When she was widowed in 1859, she returned to Denmark. In 1891, Christiane Lüth and her daughter Damaris and sister Hanne visited Greece again.

== Diary ==
Her diary was published in Danish in 1906–1927. Her diary described the journey to Greece via Saxony, Vienna and Trieste, and the life at the Greek royal court primarily from 1839 until the 3 September 1843 Revolution, with shorter entries from September 1843 until April 1845. The published diary also includes the travel diary from Christiane Lüth's sister Hanne Fischer, describing the journey home from Greece in May 1852 to Denmark in August.

This was the period of the Germans' dominance of the Greek royal court. At this period of time, the independent Kingdom of Greece had only just been established after the liberation from the Ottoman Empire. She described the capital of Athens as more similar to a small merchant town than a capital, and the Old Royal Palace had not yet been finished. The king and queen were both foreigners from Germany, and the Royal court were with few exceptions composed by Germans courtiers, surrounded by a colony of Germans who had come to seek their fortune in the capital of the new nation. The Greek population had been isolated from contact with Western Europe for centuries and were surprised to see the Queen and the other Western European women do things such as riding and participating in balls and other leisure activities, which were normal in Western Europe but until then uncommon in Greece. This atmosphere is described in the diary.

The diary describe several both big and small historical events she attended, among them the inauguration of the Old Royal Palace (summer of 1843), the 3 September 1843 Revolution, the inauguration of the Greek Parliament "Sineleusis" in January 1844, king Otto's public oath to the constitution in the Parliament on 18 March 1844, and the first royal court ball held in the Royal Palace on 22 November 1844.

She wrote about small incidents, such as one during the inauguration of the Royal Palace:

"In the summer Their Majesties moved in to the New Palace, which was now finally completed. A grand banquet was given there, and following it they escorted their guests around all of their rooms, which were very beautiful. When we entered the Queen's bedroom, one of the gentlemen, a Greek, stepped forward and punched a big fist in the mattress of her bed, creating a deep pit. This lack of decorum was however ignored, as were the many witty remarks which was said of the incident."

She wrote about the king's oath to the constitution 18 March 1844:

"The Queen arived first with her ladies, the took the back stairs and settled on the gallery colorful like tulips. The King arrived and seated on his throne under shouts and screams, made his oath and left with the Queen. In order to see better we climbed the chairs; because of that I lost my balance and fell upon a Palikar, who screamed as if the walls of Jericho was about to fall [...] We had almost lost our clothes before we came out, the crowd pressed so much and the military was not able to maintain the order."

Christiane Lüth describes a number of well known contemporaries at court and in the city, of whom the majority belonged to the Western European colony of Athens, but also prominent Greeks. Among the people she described in her diary were the king's physician doctor Rosen, Filippos Ioannou, Sophie de Marbois-Lebrun, Duchess of Plaisance and Theoklitos Farmakidis.
