= Panayiotis Simopoulos =

Greek model

- Born: Panayiotis Simopoulos; Greece
- Modeling information
- Height: 189 cm (6 ft 2 in); 6' 2.5"
- Hair color: Brown
- Eye color: Blue
- Website: Ace Models

Panayiotis Simopoulos (Greek: Παναγιώτης Σιμόπουλος) is one of Greece's top male fashion models. He has appeared in numerous fashion magazines and events promoting Greek and international products and appearing on ad campaigns for department stores such as JC Penney. He booked the campaign for the Dolce & Gabbana catalogue Summer 2006, shooting by Marianco Vivanco. He is represented by Ace Model Agency, based in Athens, Greece.

== Job Appearances ==
- Dolce & Gabbana, S/S 06 campaign
- Autumn Cashmere
- Armani
- Cole Haan
- Beau Brummel
- Velvet Underground
- Levi's *Givenchy
- Paul Smith
- Giorgio Armani
- Rene Lezard, F/W 06 campaign

"Daniel Hechter, F/W 06 campaign" "Levi’s Silver Tab, F/W 05 campaign " "Edwin, F/W 04 campaign"

== Agencies ==
- KULT, Hamburg
- DNA, New York
- Models One, London
- New Madison, Paris
- WHY NOT, Milan
