= Lysandros Kaftanzoglou =

Greek university professor and architect

Lysandros Kaftanzoglou (Greek: Λύσανδρος Καυτανζόγλου, 1811–1885) was a Greek architect of the 19th century and Chancellor of the National Technical University of Athens.

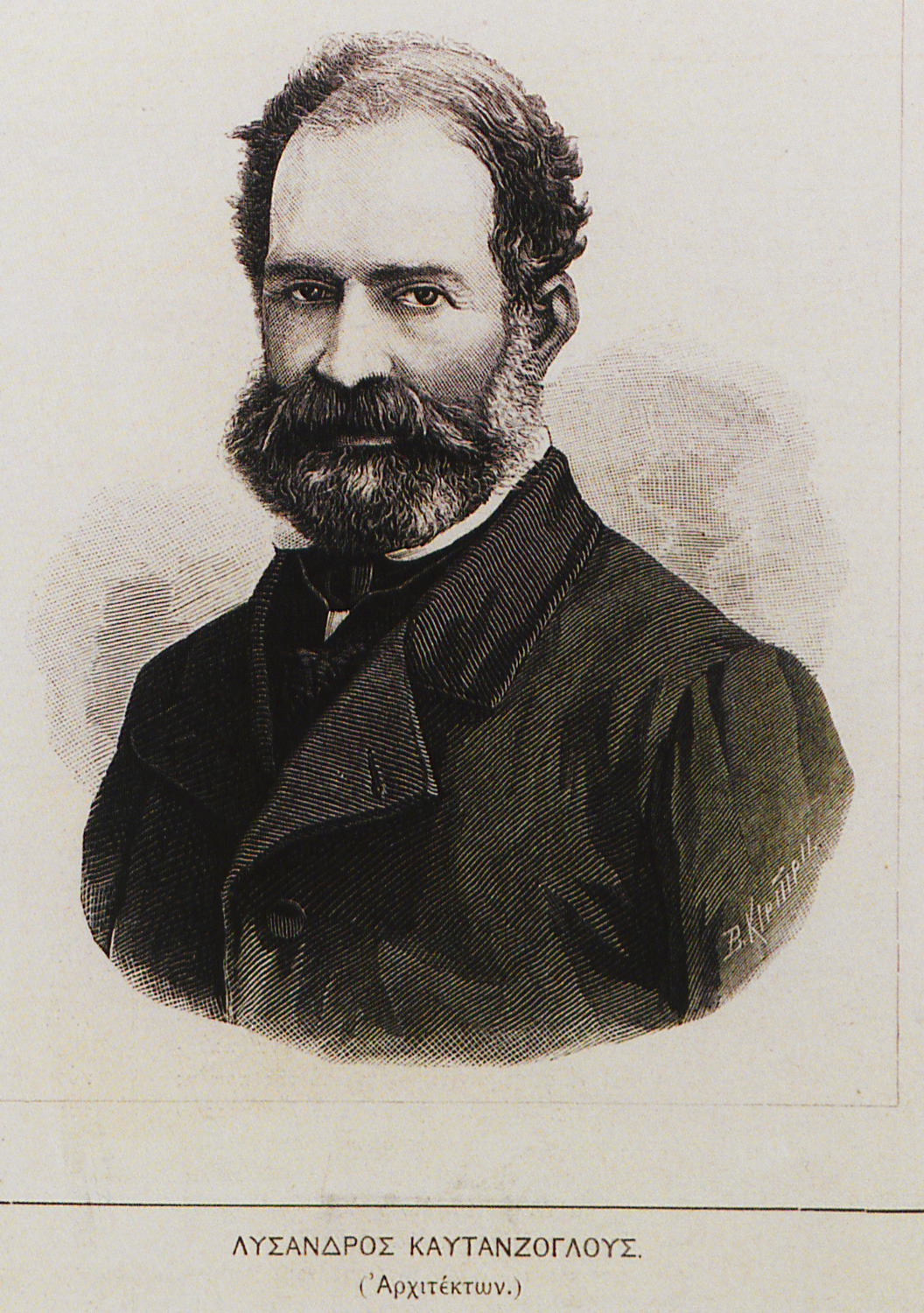
Lysandros Kaftanzoglou

He was born in Thessaloniki. During the massacres of the Greek community in 1821 by the Ottomans, his family left for Marseille. He later studied architecture in Rome.

He worked in independent Greece and designed buildings in Athens and other cities.

Some of his works include:

- The building of the National Technical University of Athens.
- The old St Andrew church in Patras.
- The old building of Arsakeion, Athens (today houses the Council of State).
- Cathedral Basilica of St. Dionysius the Areopagite
- Saint Irene Church, Athens
- Ophthalmological Hospital, Athens
- St Constantine church, Omonoia, Athens

The Kaftanzoglio Stadium in Thessaloniki is named after him.

== Gallery ==
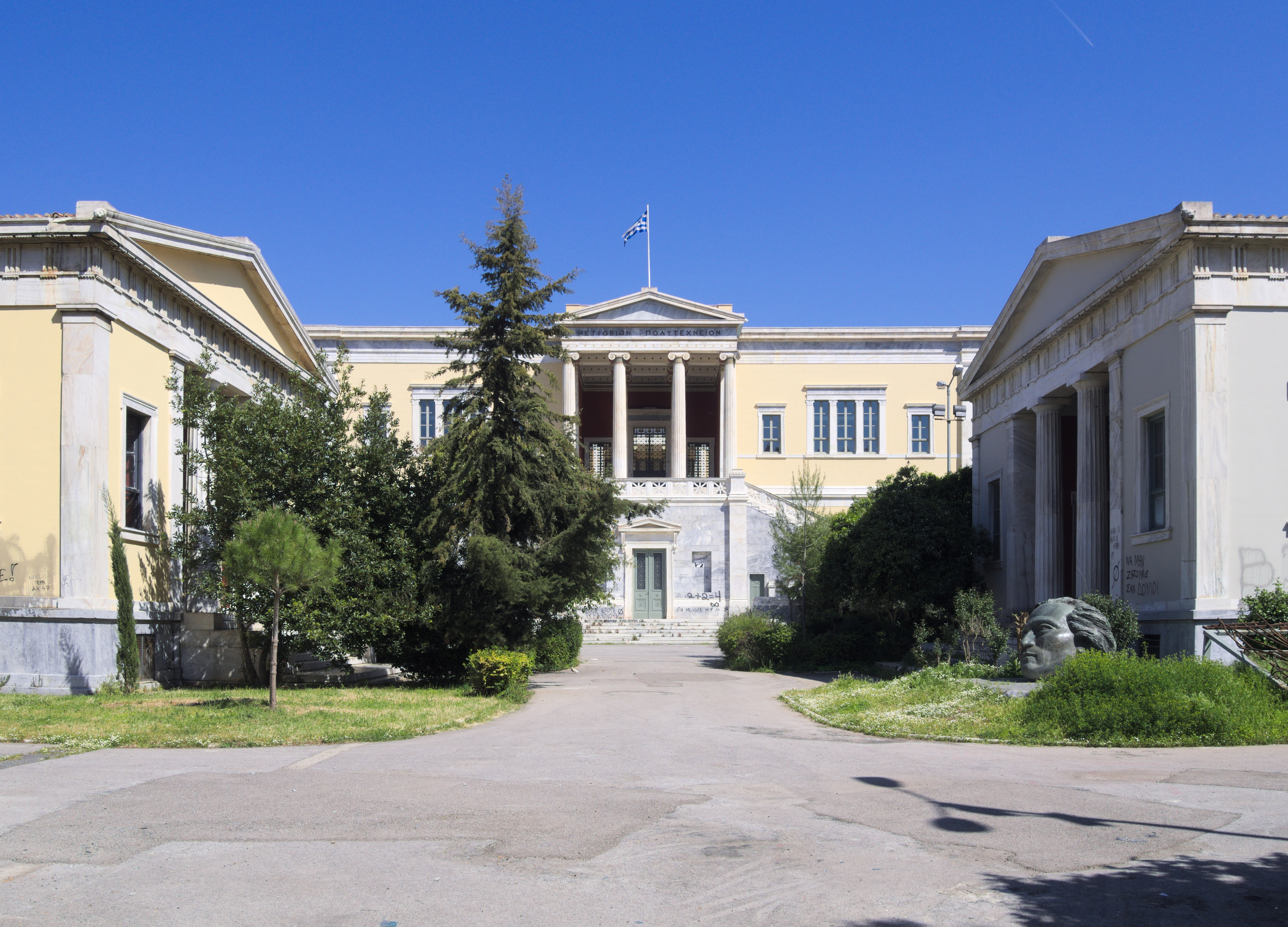
Entrance of the National Technical University of Athens

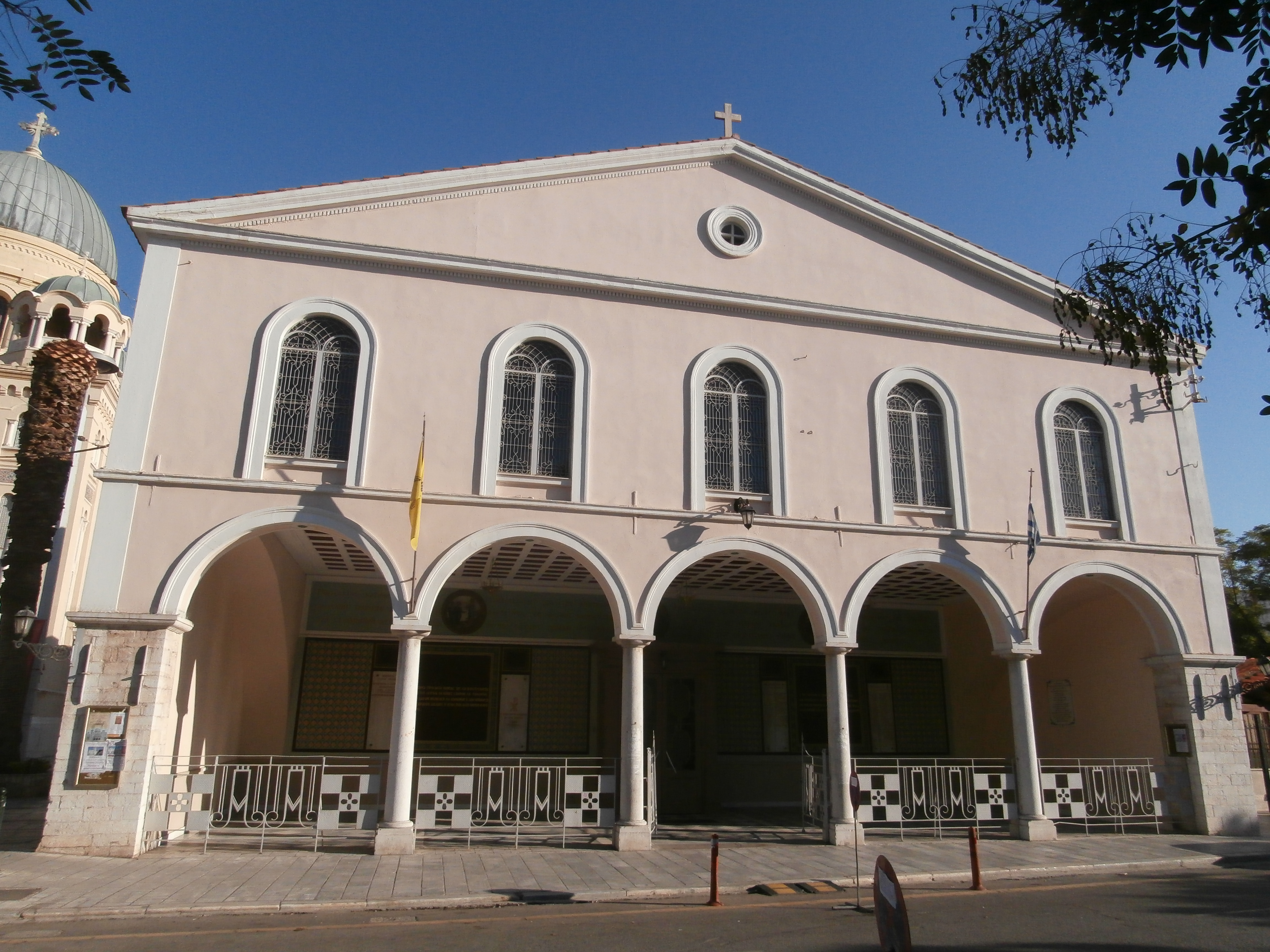
The old St Andrew church, Patras

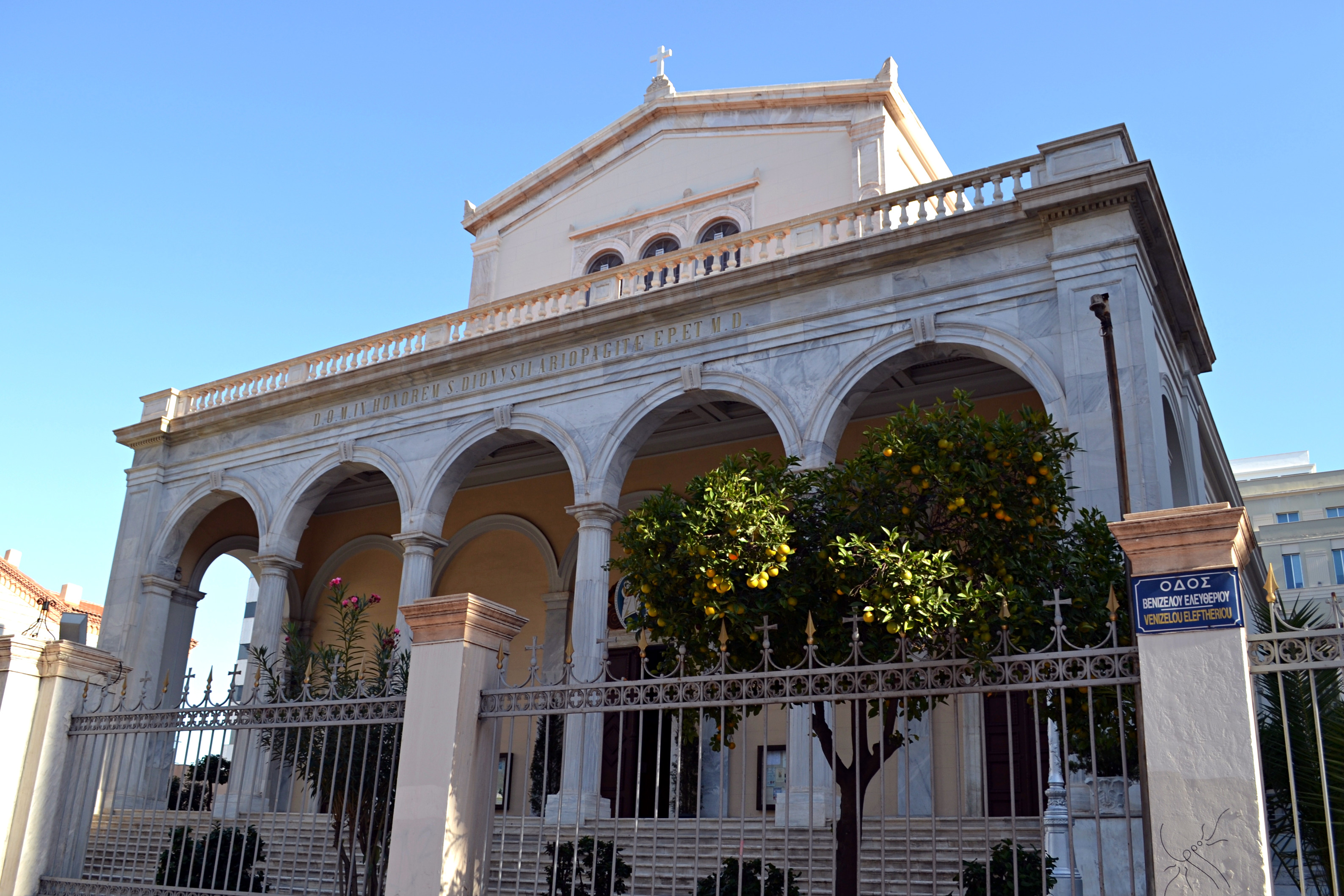
St. Dionysius the Areopagite, Athens

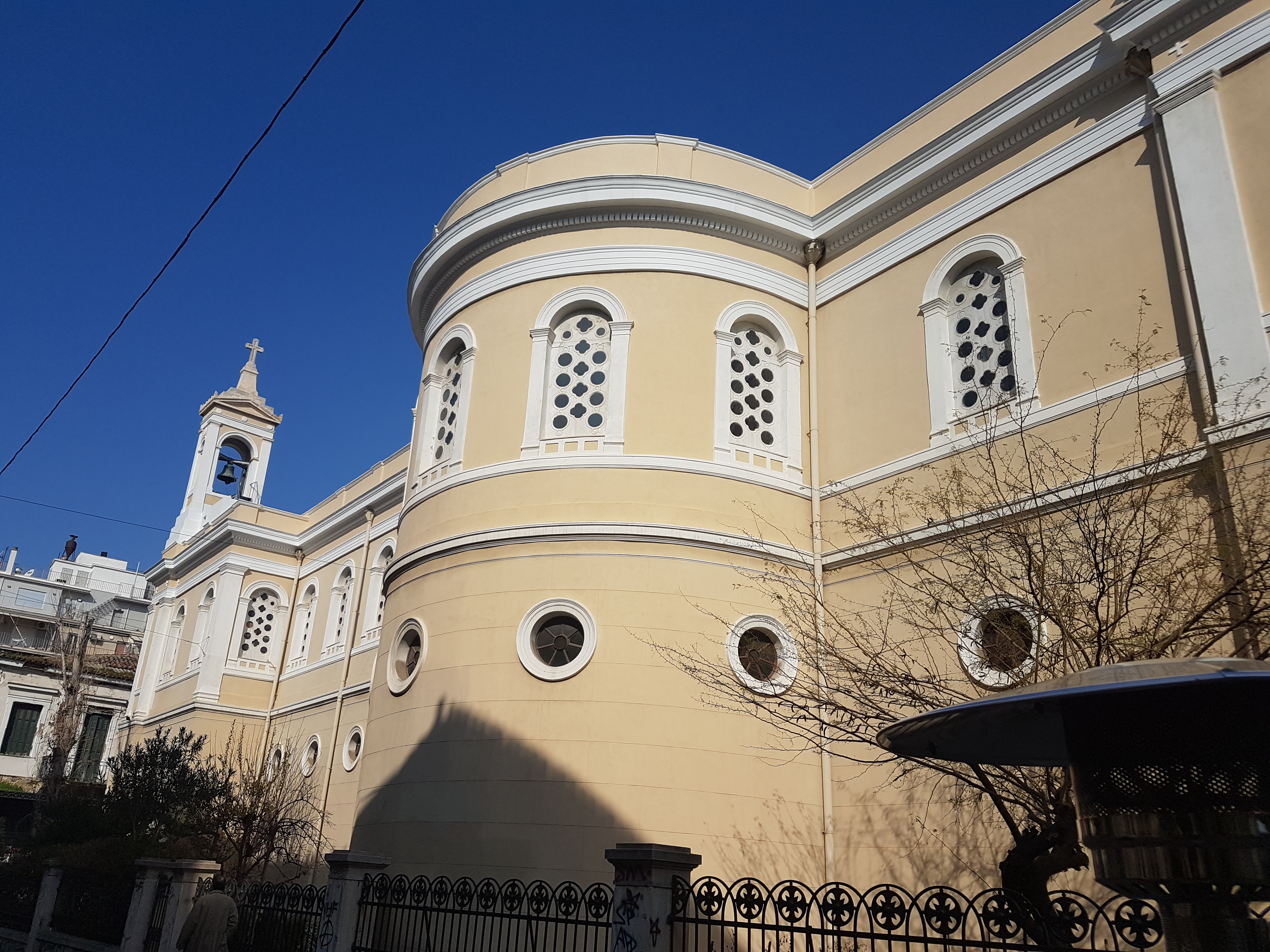
St Irene church, Aiolou street, Athens

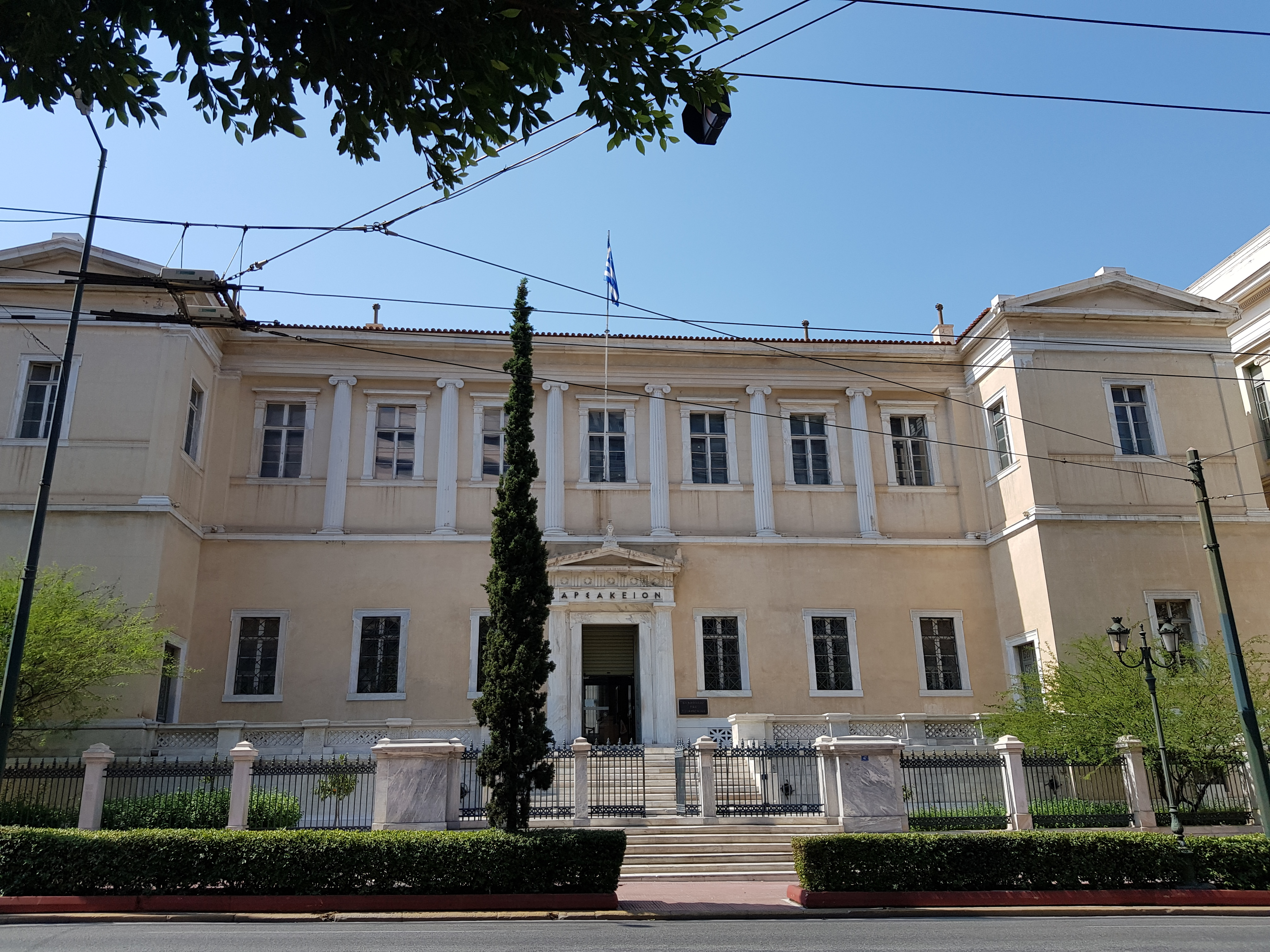
Arsakeion

== Sources ==
- Λύσανδρος Καυταντζόγλου biography

== Bibliography ==
- Volkert, Klaus; Menghini, Marta; Barbin, Évelyne (2019). Descriptive Geometry, The Spread of a Polytechnic Art The Legacy of Gaspard Monge. Cham, Switzerland: Springer International Publishing. ISBN 9783030148089.
