= Panayiotou =

Panayiotou (Παναγιώτου; also transcribed as Panagiotou) is a surname of Greek origin. Notable people with the surname include:

- Andreas Panayiotou (footballer) (born 1966), Cypriot footballer
- Andreas Panayiotou Filiotis (born 1995), Cypriot footballer
- Emilios Panayiotou (born 1992), Cypriot footballer
- Fidias Panayiotou (born 2000), Cypriot YouTuber
- Georgios Kyriacos Panayiotou, birth name of George Michael (1963–2016), English singer and songwriter
- Harry Panayiotou (born 1994), Saint Kitts and Nevis footballer
- Nicos Panayiotou (born 1970), Cypriot footballer
- Panayiotis Panayiotou (born 1988), Cypriot footballer

== See also ==
- Panayiotou v Sony Music Entertainment (UK) Ltd.
