= Filippos Ioannou =

Greek professor and benefactor

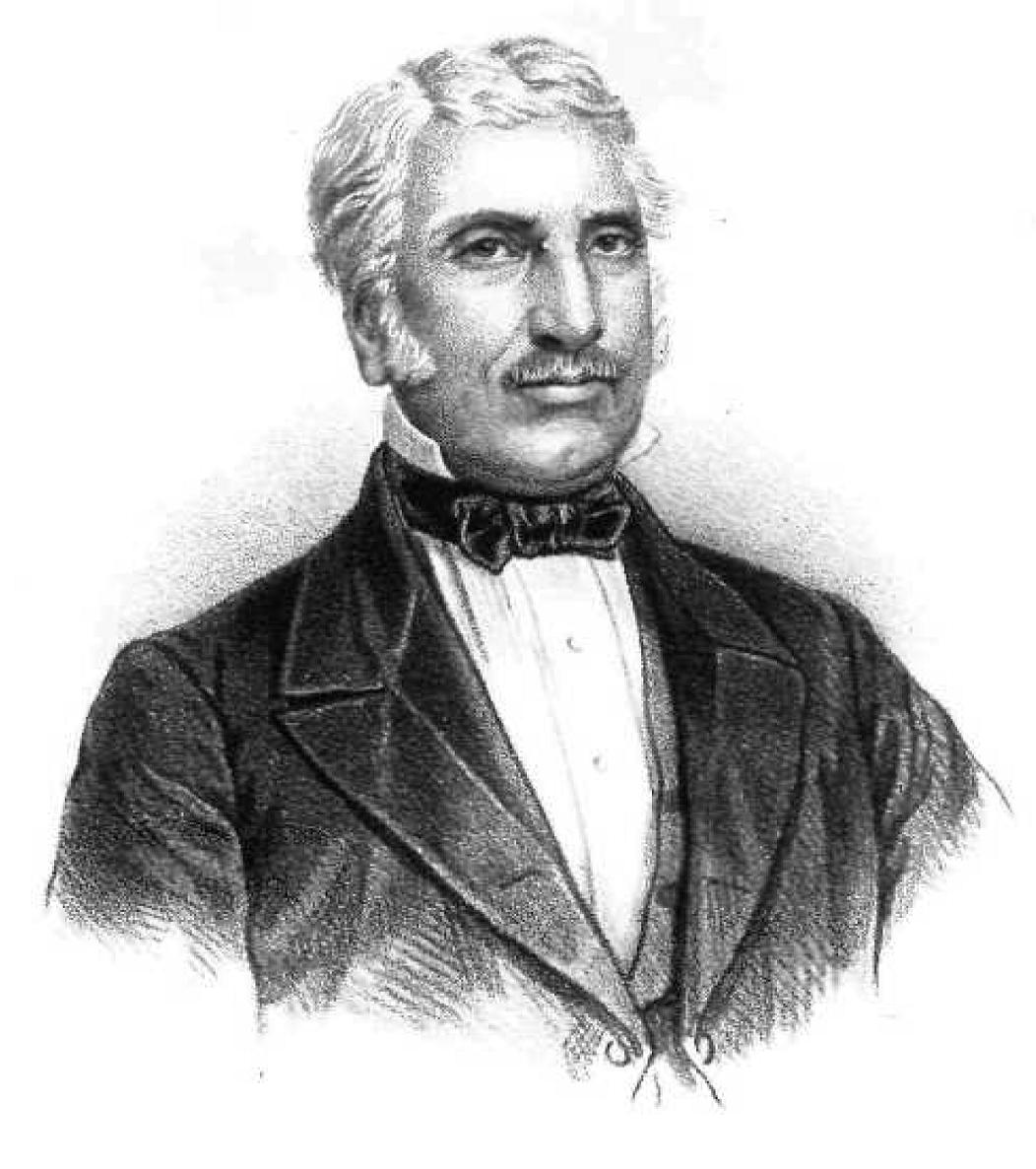
Filippos Ioannou in Marinos Papadopoulos Vretos' National Calendar (1863)

Filippos Ioannou Pantos (Greek: Φίλιππος Ιωάννου Πάντος; c. 1796 in Zagora – 1880) was a Greek 19th century benefactor professor of the University of Athens.

== Sources ==
- Λεύκωμα της εκατονταετηρίδος της Εν Αθήναις Αρχαιολογικής Εταιρείας 1837 - 1937. Athens: Athens Archaeological Society. 1937. pp. 86.
