= List of numismatic collections =

Many history and cultural museums have large numismatic collections (coins, money, and tokens). Some museums are specifically dedicated to the history of money or coins, while others have major collections amongst other material. Many small museums often have important collections of coins from their local area or important archaeological sites.

Country	State/City	Institution	Numismatic collection		Ref.
Country	State/City	Institution	Individual objects	Coins	Ref.
Argentina	Buenos Aires	Casa de Moneda de la República Argentina			
Armenia	Yerevan	History Museum of Armenia			
Afghanistan	Kabul	Kabul Museum			
Australia	Sydney	Australian Centre for Ancient Numismatic Studies		5,000	
Australia	Sydney	Sir William Dixson numismatic collection	7,800		
Austria	Vienna	Kunsthistorisches Museum	600,000		
Azerbaijan		Azerbaijan State Museum of History		100,000	
Bahrain	Manama	Central Bank of Bahrain Currency Museum			
Bangladesh	Dhaka	Bangladesh Bank Taka Museum			
Belgium	Brussels	Brussels Coin Cabinet			
Belgium	Brussels	National Bank of Belgium Museum			
Brazil	Brasília	Central Bank Museum			
Brazil	Rio de Janeiro	National Historical Museum			
Brazil	Rio de Janeiro	Banco do Brasil's Cultural Center			
Brazil	São Paulo	Instituto Itaú Cultural			
Brunei	Bandar Seri Begawan	Currency Gallery Brunei Darussalam			
Canada	Ottawa	Currency Museum Bank of Canada			
China	Beijing	China Numismatic Museum			
China	Shanghai	Shanghai Museum			
Colombia	Bogotá	Museo Casa de Moneda	18,600		
Colombia	Bogotá	National Museum of Colombia			
Costa Rica	San José	Numismatic Museum			
Cuba	Havana	Numismatic Museum			
Cyprus	Nicosia	Museum of the History of Cypriot Coinage - Bank of Cyprus Cultural Foundation	Over 500		
Denmark	Copenhagen	National Museum of Denmark			
Dominican Republic	Santo Domingo	Central Bank of the Dominican Republic			
Dominican Republic	Santo Domingo	Casa de los Cinco Medallones (Numismatic museum of Santo Domingo)			
France		Cabinet des Médailles, Bibliothèque nationale de France	500,000		
France	Paris	Monnaie de Paris	300,000	70,000	
France	Perpignan	Musée des Monnaies et Médailles Joseph Puig			
Georgia	Tbilisi	National Bank of Georgia			
Germany	Berlin	Bode Museum	500,000: including; 25,000 medals; 10,000 dies		
Germany	Dresden	Coin Cabinet in Royal Palace / Münzkabinett im Residenzschloss			
Germany	Frankfurt	Numismatic Museum/Münzkabinett Historisches Museum Frankfurt	150,000		
Germany	Jena	Oriental Coin Cabinet Jena			
Germany	Munich	Staatliche Münzsammlung München			
Germany	Münster	Westphalian State Museum of Art and Cultural History			
Greece		Numismatic Museum of Athens	500,000		
Guatemala	Guatemala City	Museo Numismático de Guatemala			
Hungary	Budapest	Visitor centre of the Hungarian National Bank			
India	New Delhi	National Museum, New Delhi			
India	Mumbai	Reserve Bank of India Museum			
India	Chennai	Government Museum			
India		Alkesh Dinesh Mody Institute			
India	Nashik	Indian Institute for Research in Numismatic Studies	175,000		
India		RBI Monetary Museum, Numismatic Museum, Fort Mumbai, [15]			
India		Shri Mudra Nidhi Coin Museum, Numismatic Museum			
India		Coin Museum Corp Bank, located at Udupi (Karnataka)[16]			
Indonesia	Jakarta	Bank Indonesia Museum Collection : Money			
Indonesia	Purbalingga	Museum Uang Purbalingga			
Iran	Tehran	Malek National Museum of Iran			
Iran	Tehran	Tehran Coin Museum			
Iran	Tehran	Money Museum			
Iran	Mashhad	Astan Quds Razavi Central Museum			
Iran	Kerman	Ganjali Khan Mint Museum			
Israel	Jerusalem	Israel Museum			
Italy	Florence	Museo della Moneta a Firenze			
Italy	Florence	National Archaeological Museum in Florence			
Italy	Lucca	Lucca Mint/Zecca di Lucca			
Italy	Naples	Naples National Archaeological Museum			
Italy	Rome	National Museum of Rome Crypta Balbi/Museo Nazionale Romano: Crypta Balbi			
Italy	Rome Banca d'Italia	School groups only and by appointment only. Banca d'Italia Museo della Moneta			
Japan	Tokyo	Bank of Japan Money – IMES BOJ Currency Museum			
Jordan	Amman	Central Bank of Jordan - Currency Museum			
Malaysia	Kuala Lumpur	Bank Negara Malaysia Museum and Art Gallery			
Mexico	Mexico City	Casa de Moneda de México			
Netherlands	Haarlem	Teylers Museum	17,000	8,500	
Netherlands	Amsterdam	Nationale Numismatische Collectie/De Nederlandsche Bank	400,000		
Netherlands	Rotterdam	Nederlands Economisch Penningenkabinet (NEPK)	2,800		
Netherlands	Leiden	Rijksmuseum van Oudheden			
Nepal	Kathmandu	National Museum of Nepal			
North Macedonia	Skopje	Narodna Banka na Republika Severna Makedonija			
Norway	Oslo	Museum of Cultural History, Oslo	250,000		
Paraguay	Asunción	Numismatica Independencia			
Pakistan	Karachi	SBP Museum			
Pakistan		National Museum of Pakistan		58,000	
Pakistan		Lahore Museum			
Pakistan		Peshawar Museum		8,625	
Pakistan		Taxila Site Museum			
Peru	Lima	Museo Numismático del Perú			
Philippines	Manila	Museo ng Bangko Sentral ng Pilipinas			
Poland	Warsaw	National Museum, Warsaw			
Poland	Kraków	The Emeryk Hutten-Czapski Museum			
Portugal	Lisbon	Museu Numismático Português			
Qatar	Doha	Sheikh Faisal Bin Qassim Al Thani Museum			
Romania	Bucharest	The Museum of the National Bank of Romania			
Russia	Saint Petersburg	Hermitage Museum	1,125,000		
Serbia	Belgrade	National Bank of Serbia (Народна Банка Србије)			
Singapore	Singapore	Singapore Coins and Notes Museum			
Slovakia	Kremnica	Museum of Coins and Medals - National Bank of Slovakia			
Slovakia	Košice	Košice gold treasure, East Slovak Museum			
South Africa	Johannesburg	Absa Money Museum			
Spain	Madrid	Museo Casa de la Moneda			
Spain	Barcelona	Museu Nacional d'Art de Catalunya, numismatic collection			
Suriname	Paramaribo	Numismatic Museum of the Centrale Bank van Suriname			
Sweden	Stockholm	Royal Coin Cabinet	650,000		
Sweden	Uppsala	Uppsala University Coin Cabinet	40,000		
Switzerland	Zürich	Money Museum			
Thailand	Bangkok	Pavilion of Regalia, Royal Decorations and Coins e-museum			
Trinidad and Tobago	Port of Spain	Central Bank of Trinidad and Tobago museum			
Turkey	Ankara	CBRT Numismatics Museum			
Turkmenistan		Saparamyrat Türkmenbaşy National Museum of Turkmenistan, Unknown Collection			
Turkmenistan	Ashgabat	Ashgabat National Museum of History, Unknown Collection			
Ukraine	Odesa	Odesa Numismatics Museum	3000		
Ukraine	Kyiv	National Museum of the History of Ukraine	120,000	100,000	
Ukraine	Kamianets-Podilskyi	Museum of Money			
Ukraine	Ostroh	Museum of Money			
Ukraine	Dnipro	Museum of Ukrainian Coins	1100		
Ukraine	Odesa	Odesa Archaeological Museum	55,000		
Ukraine	Feodosia	Feodosia Money Museum	30,000		
UAE	Dubai	Dubai Coins Museum		Over 470	
United Kingdom	Oxford	Ashmolean Museum	333,000		
United Kingdom	London	Bank of England Museum	10,000+		
United Kingdom	Birmingham	Barber Institute of Fine Arts	16,000		
United Kingdom	London	British Museum Department of Coins and Medals	800,000		
United Kingdom	Cambridge	Fitzwilliam Museum	200,000		
United Kingdom	Glasgow	Hunterian Museum and Art Gallery	70,000		
United Kingdom	Leeds	Leeds University Library Special Collections	20,000		
United Kingdom	Manchester	Manchester Museum	50,000+: including; 3,000 medals; 4,000 communion token	40,000	
United Kingdom	Edinburgh	Museum on the Mound			
United Kingdom	Llantrisant	Royal Mint Museum	140,000+: including; 80,000 coins; 12,000 medals; 8,000 volumes; 30,000 master tools and dies; 10,000 photographs and negatives	80,000	
United Kingdom	Liverpool	World Museum	18,000: including; 1,400 medals; 3,000 tokens & misc	7,450	
United States	Colorado Springs, Colorado	American Numismatic Association Money Museum	275,000		
United States	New Haven, Connecticut	Yale University Art Gallery Numismatic Collection	120,000		
United States	Washington, D.C.	Smithsonian Institution National Numismatic Collection	1,600,000		
United States	Kansas City, Missouri	The Money Museum			
United States	Cleveland, Ohio	Learning Center and Money Museum			
United States	Manchester, New Hampshire	America's Credit Union Museum			
United States	Princeton, New Jersey	Princeton University Library Rare Books and Special Collections	100,000		
United States	New York City, New York	American Numismatic Society	600,000		
United States	New York City, New York	Museum of American Finance			
United States	Omaha, Nebraska	Durham Museum			
United States	Chapel Hill, North Carolina	North Carolina Collection at the University of North Carolina at Chapel Hill Library	10,000		
Uzbekistan	Bukhara	Bukhara State Museum, Unknown Collection			
Uzbekistan		Central Bank of Uzbekistan, Minor Collection 400+ coins			
Uzbekistan	Shahrisabz	Shahrisabz Museum of History and Material Culture, Minor Collection			
Uzbekistan		State Museum of History of Uzbekistan. Unknown Collection			
Vatican	Vatican City	Philatelic and Numismatic Museum/ Museo Filatelico e Numismatico			

== See also ==
- Category:Numismatic museums
