= State Bank Archives and Museum =

Museum and archive in Kolkata, India

- Established: 13 May 2007; 18 years ago
- Location: 11th Floor, Block ‘B’, Samriddhi Bhawan, Strand Road, Kolkata, West Bengal 700001
- Coordinates: 22.569°N 88.343°E
- Owner: Government of India
- Website: sbi.co.in/web/sbi-am

The State Bank Archives and Museum is an initiative to document and preserve the history of banking in the Indian subcontinent. The archive and museum opened on 13 May 2007 in the State Bank of India (SBI) headquarters in Kolkata.

== Archive ==
The SBI Archive houses historical records, documents, photographs, manuscripts, and other valuable materials pertaining to the history of banking in the Indian subcontinent. This diverse collection primarily covers the history of the bank between 1806-1955 and consists of more than 25000 records.

== Museum ==
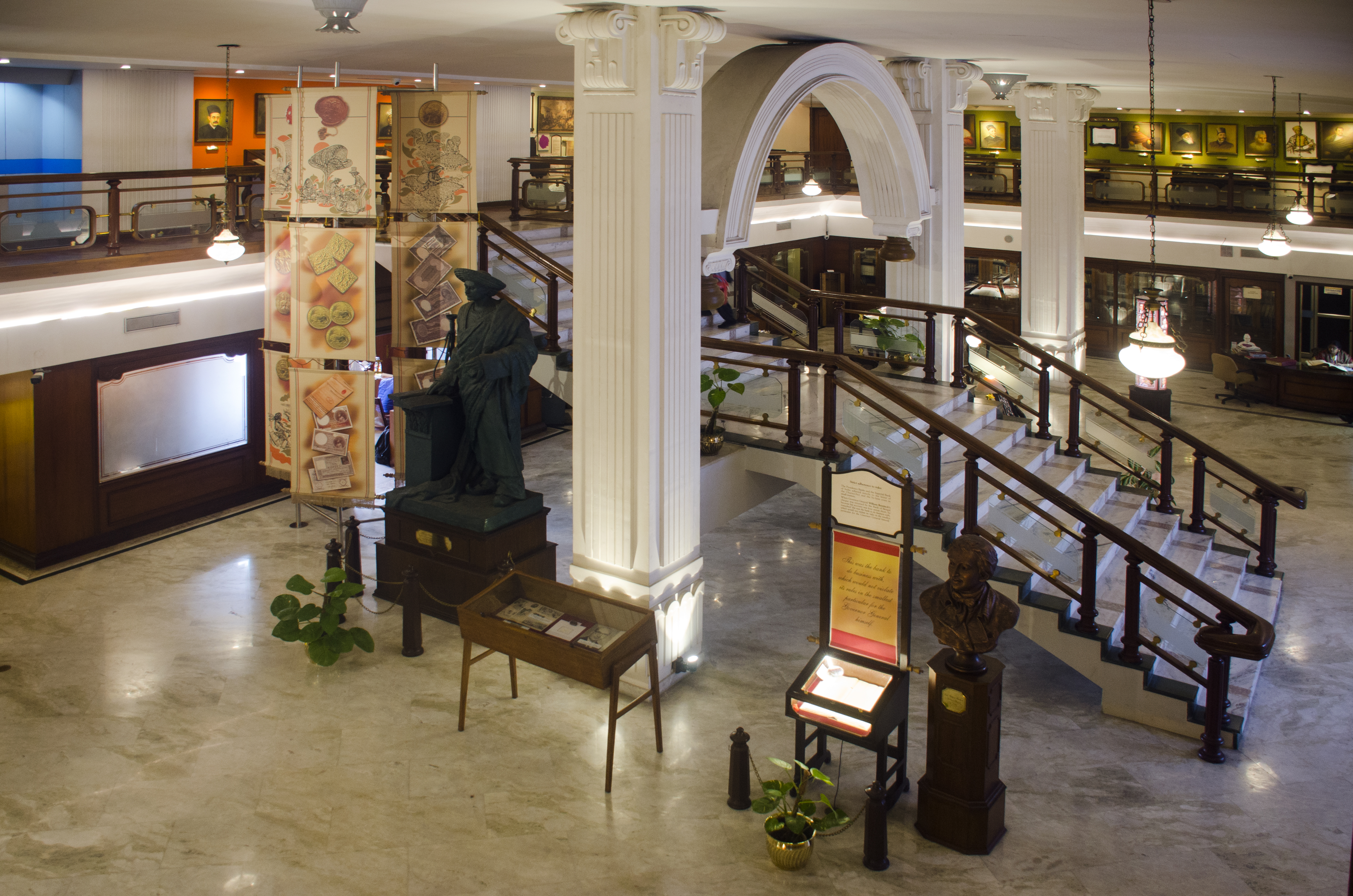
State Bank Archives and Museum, Kolkata

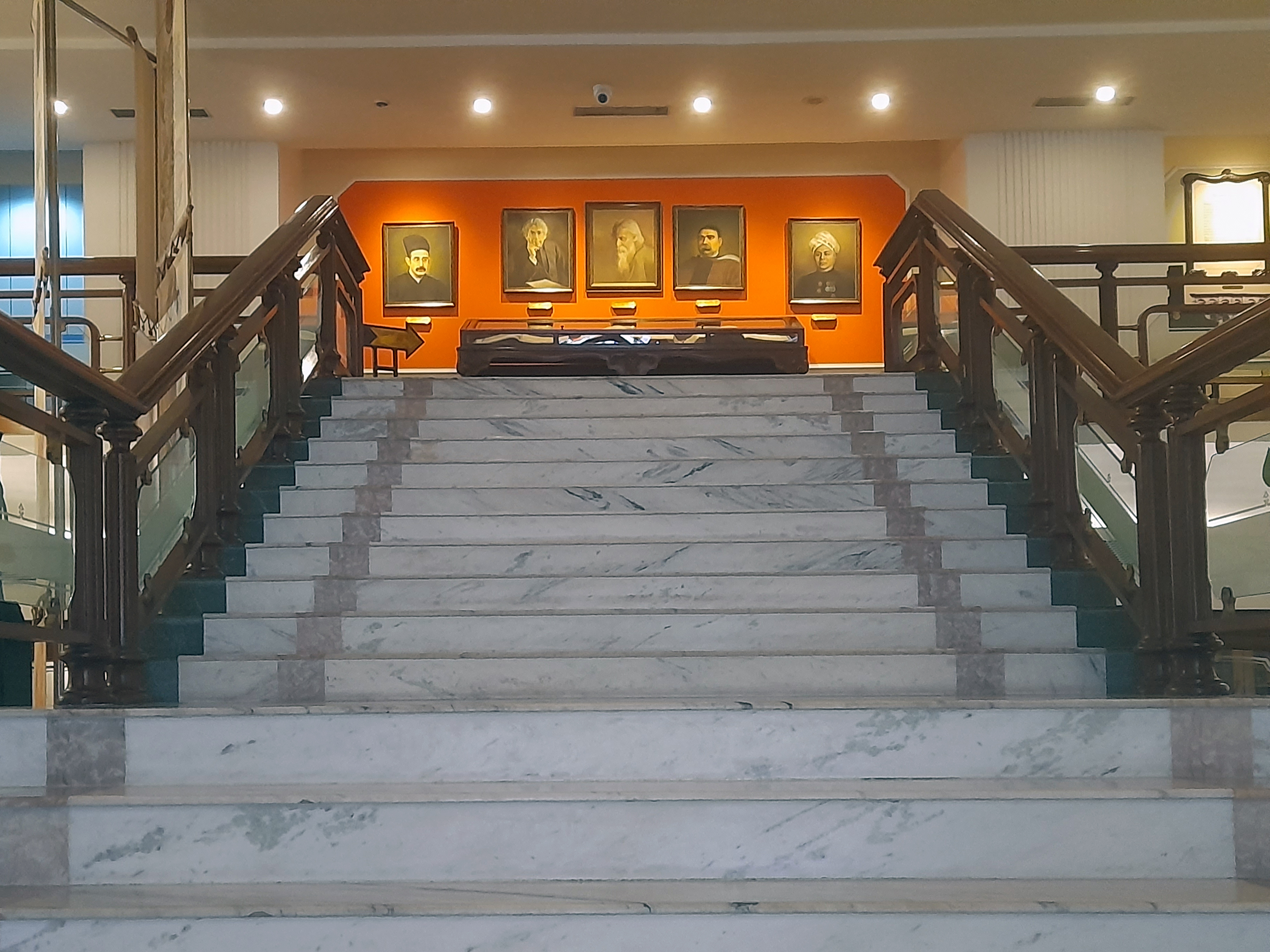
Staircase leading to the balcony, State Bank Archives and Museum, Kolkata

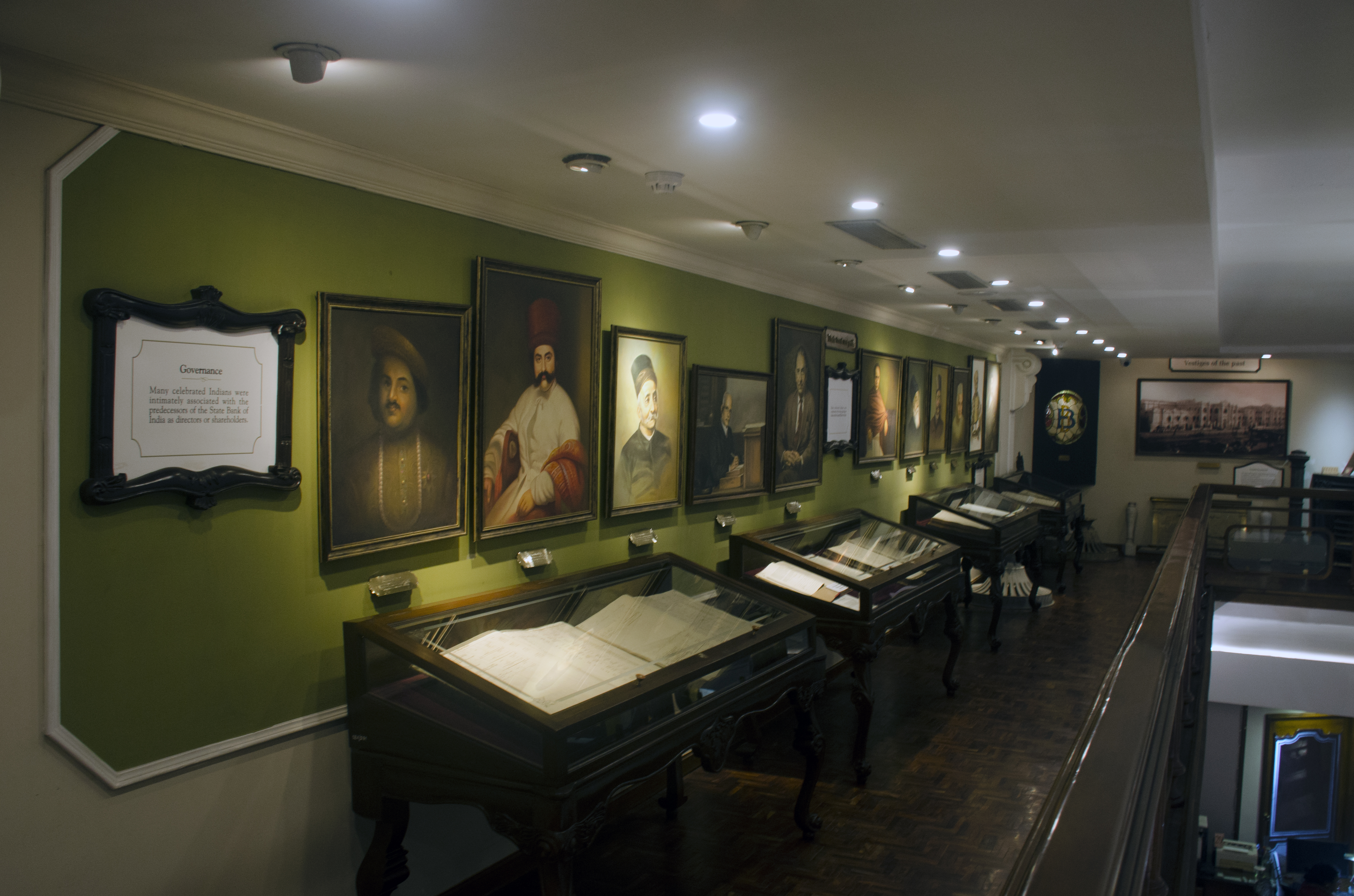
Exhibits at State Bank Archives and Museum, Kolkata

The SBI Museum has original documents, memorabilia, statues, artefacts, dioramas and murals on public display. The museum also provides a peek into the personal finances of influential Bengali Renaissance figures such as Rabindranath Tagore, Ishwar Chandra Vidyasagar, and theosophist Annie Besant. At the entrance of the museum is a statue of Tagore's grandfather Dwarkanath Tagore, a prominent industrialist of his time and one of the earliest contributors towards the growth of the Bank.

Exhibits include:

- Complaint registers of the Bank of Bengal
- 1889 Notes of the Banks of Bengal
- Bombay and Madras Account opening forms and ledgers of eminent personalities
- Pass Books
- Instruments of Banking
- Important Agreements
- Scrolls of fidelity and secrecy
- Some relics of the former Bank of Bengal building in Calcutta
- Illustrations of buildings
- Leaflets and journals
- Weights and measures, swords and pistols, seals and insignia, trophies, etc.
- Old publications of the Bank

== Library ==
The SBI Library has around 5000 rare books and journals relevant to Indian economic history. The diverse collection includes past banking acts, laws, regulations, reports and commentaries which not only reflect the commercial ambitions of the English East India Company but also highlight the origins and economic trajectory of the State Bank of India. The library also comprises various biographies, memories and letters of prominent individuals.

== See also ==
- RBI Monetary Museum
- Money Museum, Nasik
- State Bank of India
