= Ioannis Svoronos =

Greek archaeologist and numismatist (1863–1922)

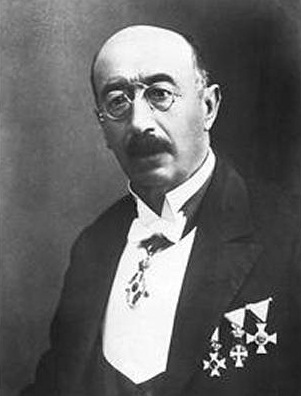
Ioannis Svoronos

Ioannis N. Svoronos (Greek: Ιωάννης Ν. Σβορώνος; 15 April 1863 – 25 August 1922) was a Greek archaeologist and numismatist.

== Life ==
Ioannis Svoronos was born in 1863 on the island of Mykonos. After completing school he enrolled in the Law School of the University of Athens, but abandoned his studies to dedicate himself to archaeology and numismatics. He studied the latter in the universities of Berlin, London and Paris (1883–1887). On his return to Greece he was hired by the Numismatic Museum of Athens, where he worked until his death, serving also as its director from 1899. In 1918–1920 he was also Professor of Numismatics at the University of Athens. From 1898 he published the journal Journal International d’Archéologie Numismatique. He was awarded the medal of the Royal Numismatic Society in 1914, and the Huntington Medal Award given by the American Numismatic Society in 1921.

He died in Athens in 1922.

== Publications ==
- Numismatique de la Crète ancienne: accompagnée de l'histoire, la géographie et la mythologie de l'ile. Ouvrage récompensé par l’Académie des inscriptions et belles-lettres (Paris) et pub. aux frais de l’Assemblée des Crétois, Macon: Impr. Protat frères, 1890.
- Περί της σημασίας των νομισματικών τύπων των αρχαίων. Σβορώνος, Ιωάννης Ν., [1895].
- Φως επί των αρχαιολογικών σκανδάλων / Υπό Ιωάννου Ν. Σβορώνου. Αθήνησιν: Εκ του Τυπογραφείου των Αδελφών Περρή, 1896.
- Ο Λυκούργος και Αμβροσία [Ανάτυπο] / Ι. Ν. Σβορώνου, Athenes: Barth et von Hirst, 1898.
- Περί των εισιτηρίων των αρχαίων / I. N. Σβορώνου. Εν Αθήναις]: [Βαρτ και Χιρστ], [1898].
- Τις η νήσος "Συρίη" του Ομήρου (Συνέχεια και τέλος.) / Ι.Ν. Σβορώνου. Athènes: Barth et von Hirst, [1899].
- Νομίσματα [ανάτυπο] : Α'.) Αλεξανδρινά αστρονομικά. Β.) Απολλωνίας της εν Πόντω και της νήσου Πεπαρήθου / Ι.Ν. Σβορώνου. Athènes: Barth et von Hirst, éditeurs, [1899].
- Χρυσά νομίσματα και εικόνες των βασιλισσών της Αιγύπτου [ανάτυπο] / Ι.Ν. Σβορώνου. Athènes: Barth et von Hirst, [1899].
- Βυζαντιακά νομισματικά ζητήματα : Μετά 70 εικόνων / υπό Ιω. Ν. Σβορώνου. Αθήναι: Barth και von Hirst Εκδόται, 1899.
- Der athenische Volkskalender. Athen: Barth und von Hirst, 1899.
- Les Nouveaux timbres-poste de l’île de Crète et le modèles de monnaies antiques. La Canée: Imprimerie du Gouvernement Crétois, 1905.
- Ερμηνεία των μνημείων του Ελευσινιακού μυστικού κύκλου : και τοπογραφικά Ελευσίνος και Αθηνών / υπό Ιω. Ν. Σβορώνου.
- Ιωάννης Ν. Σβορώνος, Kαι πάλιν περί του πίνακος της Ναννίου [ανάτυπο]. Athènes: Beck et Barth.
