= Oxhide ingot =

Mediterranean Late Bronze Age metal slabs

Ingots

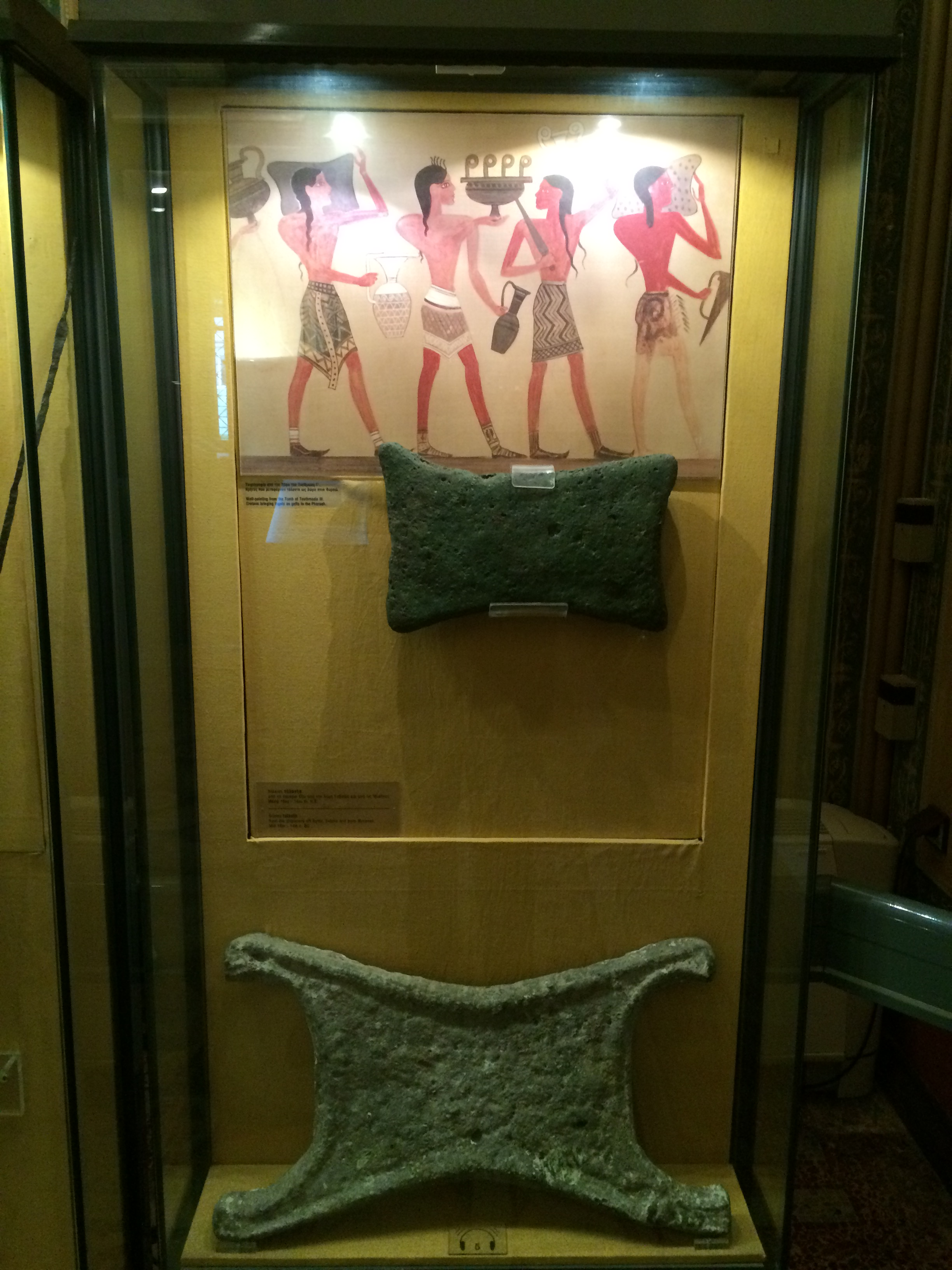
Copper ingots from Crete and Mycenae, displayed at the Numismatic Museum of Athens.

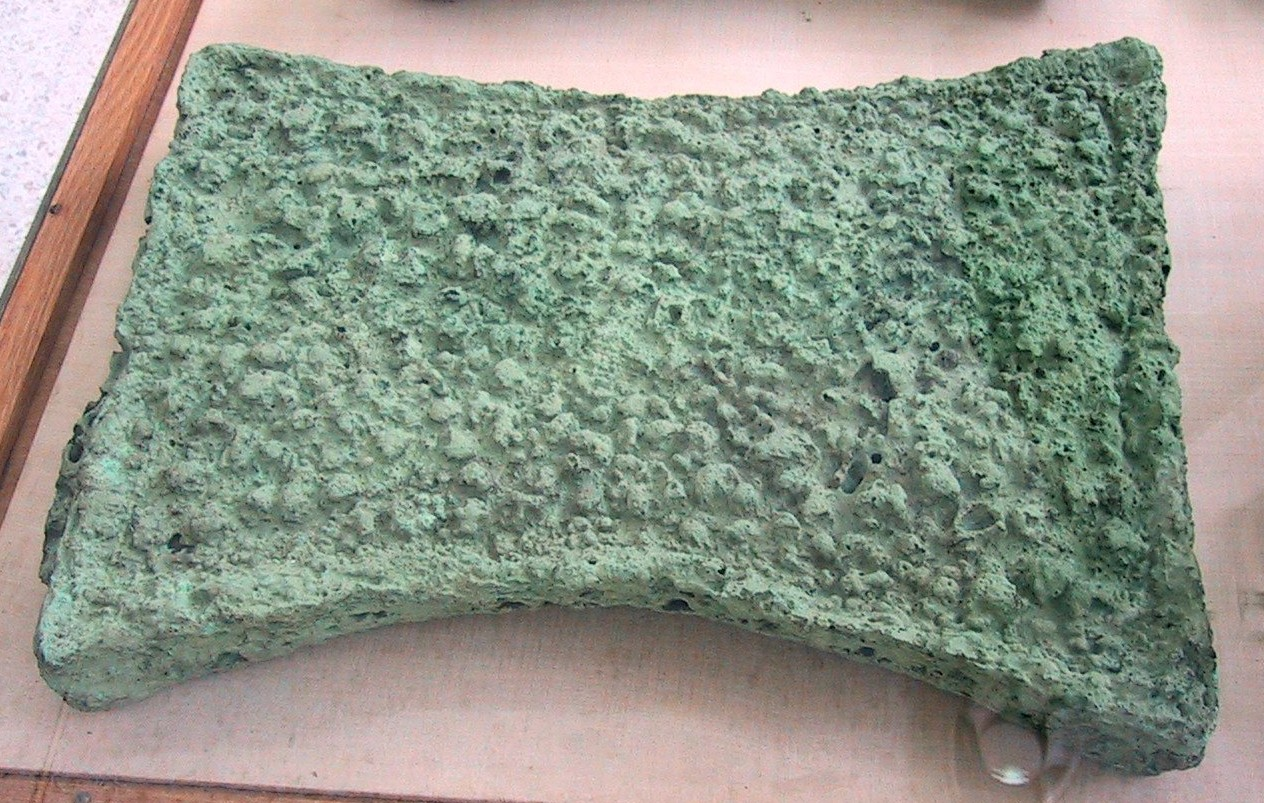
Copper ingot from Zakros, Crete, displayed at the Heraklion Archaeological Museum.

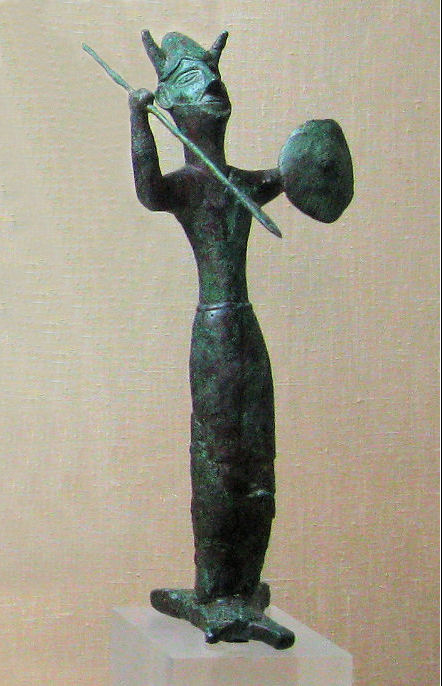
Protector of the ingot, bronze, Enkomi, Cyprus.

Oxhide ingots are heavy (20–30 kg) metal slabs, usually of copper but sometimes of tin, produced and widely distributed during the Mediterranean Late Bronze Age (LBA). Their shape resembles the hide of an ox with a protruding handle in each of the ingot's four corners. Early thought was that each ingot was equivalent to the value of one ox. However, the similarity in shape is simply a coincidence. The ingots' producers probably designed these protrusions to make the ingots easily transportable overland on the backs of pack animals. Complete or partial oxhide ingots have been discovered in Sardinia, Crete, Peloponnese, Cyprus, Cannatello in Sicily, Boğazköy in Turkey (ancient Hattusa, the Hittite capital), Qantir in Egypt (ancient Pi-Ramesses), and Sozopol in Bulgaria. Archaeologists have recovered many oxhide ingots from two shipwrecks off the coast of Turkey (one off Uluburun and one in Cape Gelidonya).

== Context ==
The appearance of oxhide ingots in the archaeological record corresponds with the beginning of the bulk copper trade in the Mediterranean—approximately 1600 BC. The earliest oxhide ingots found come from Crete and date to the Late Minoan IB, approximately 1500 BC to 1450 BC. The latest oxhide ingots date to approximately 1000 BC, and were found on Sardinia. The copper trade was largely maritime: the principal sites where oxhide ingots are found are at sea, on the coast, and on islands.

== Purposes ==
It is uncertain whether the oxhide ingots served as a form of currency. Ingots found in excavations at Mycenae are now part of the exhibits of the Numismatic Museum of Athens. Cemal Pulak argues that the weights of the Uluburun ingots are similar enough to have allowed "a rough but quick reckoning of a given quantity of raw metal prior to weighing". But George Bass proposes, via the Gelidonya ingots, whose weights are approximately the same if somewhat lower than the Uluburun ingot weights, that the weights were not standard and thus the ingots were not a currency. Another theory is that the oxhide shape, as well as the bun shape that some ingots took, was a visual statement that the ingot at hand is part of a legitimate trade. In Sardinia, oxhide ingot fragments have been found in hoards with bun ingots and scrap metal and, in some cases, in a metallurgical workshop. Citing this evidence, Vasiliki Kassianidou argues that the oxhide ingots "were meant to be used rather than to be kept as prestige goods".

== Major finds ==
=== Uluburun shipwreck ===
In 1982, a diver discovered a shipwreck off the shore of Uluburun, Turkey. The ship contained 317 copper ingots in the normal oxhide shape, 36 with only two corner protrusions, 121 shaped like buns, and five shaped like pillows. The oxhide ingots (ingots with two or four protrusions) range in weight from 20.1 to 29.5 kilograms (44 to 65 lb) after being cleaned of their corrosion. These ingots were found stacked in four rows following a herringbone pattern. The smooth sides of the ingots faced downwards, and the lowest layer rested on brushwood. There are three whole tin oxhide ingots, and there are many tin ingots cut into quarters or halves, with their corner protrusion(s) still intact. Besides metal ingots, the cargo included ivory, metal jewelry, and Mycenaean, Cypriot, and Canaanite pottery. Tree-ring dating of firewood from the ship gives an approximate date of 1300 BC. More than 160 copper oxhide ingots, 62 bun ingots, and some of the tin oxhide ingots have incised marks typically on their rough sides. Some of these marks—resembling fish, oars, and boats—relate to the sea, and they were probably incised after casting, when the ingot was received or exported.

Recently Yuval Goren proposed that the ten tons of copper ingots, one ton of tin ingots, and the resin stored in the Canaanite jars aboard the ship were one complete package. The recipients of the copper, tin, and resin would have used these materials for bronze casting through the lost-wax technique.

=== Cape Gelidonya shipwreck ===
In the early 1950s, divers found the remains of a shipwreck in Cape Gelidonya, off the coast of Turkey. The remains included a substantial amount of copper oxhide ingot material: 34 in full, five in half, 12 corners, and 75 kilograms (165 lb) of random fragments. Twenty-four full copper oxhide ingots have stamps on their centers—usually of a circle containing intersecting lines. These stamps were likely made when the metal was soft. In addition, the ship contained numerous complete and incomplete copper bun-shaped ingots, rectangular tin bars, and Cypriot agricultural tools made of scrap bronze. Radiocarbon dating of brushwood from the ship gives an approximate date of 1200 BC.

== Composition and microstructure ==
Typically the copper oxhide ingots are highly pure (approximately 99 weight percent copper) with trace element content of less than one weight percent. The few tin oxhide ingots that have been available to study are also exceptionally pure. Microscopic analysis of the Uluburun copper oxhide ingots reveals that they are highly porous. This feature results from the effervescence of gases as the molten metal cooled. Slag inclusions are also present. Their existence implies that slag was not fully removed from the smelted metal and thus that the ingots were made from remelted copper.

Macroscopic observation of the Uluburun copper ingots indicates that they were cast through multiple pours; there are distinct layers of metal in each ingot. Furthermore, the relatively high weight and high purity of the ingots would be difficult to achieve even today in only one pour.

The porosity of the copper ingots and the natural brittleness of tin suggest that both metal ingots were easy to break. As Bass et al. proposes, a metalsmith could simply break off a piece of the ingot whenever he liked for a new casting.

== Provenance ==
Controversy has swirled around the provenance of the copper oxhide ingots. Lead isotope analysis (LIA) suggests that the late LBA ingots (that is, after 1250 BC) are composed of Cypriot copper, specifically copper from the Apilki mine and its surrounding area. The Gelidonya ingots' ratios are consistent with Cypriot ores while the Uluburun ingots fall on the periphery of the Cypriot isotopic field. On the other hand, Late Minoan I ingots found on Crete have Paleozoic lead isotope ratios and are more consistent with ore sources in Afghanistan, Iran, or Central Asia. The controversy settles on the validity of LIA. Paul Budd argues that LBA copper is the product of such extensive mixing and recycling that LIA, which works best for metals from a single ore deposit, is unfeasible.

Some scholars worry that the 1250 BC date is too limiting. They note that Cyprus was smelting copper on a large scale in the early LBA and had the potential to export the metal to Crete and other places at this time. Furthermore, copper ore is more plentiful on Cyprus than on Sardinia and far more plentiful than on Crete. Archaeologists have discovered numerous Cypriot exports to Sardinia including metalworking tools and prestige metal objects.

Due to the heavy corrosion of tin oxhide ingots and the limited data for lead isotopic studies of tin, the provenance of the tin ingots has been uncertain. The fact that scholars have been unable to pinpoint Bronze Age tin ore deposits compounds this problem.

== Molds ==
A mold for casting an oxhide ingot was discovered in the LBA north palace at Ras Ibn Hani in Syria. It is made of fine-grained "ramleh", a shelly limestone. Archaeologists found burnt copper droplets around the mold. In spite of the questionable durability of limestone, Paul Craddock et al. concluded that limestone can be used for casting “large simple shapes” such as oxhide ingots. Evolution of carbon dioxide from the limestone would damage the metal surface that touched the mold. Thus, metal objects requiring surface detail could not be produced successfully.

This is not to say that oxhide ingots were normally cast in limestone molds. Using an experimental clay mold, Bass et al. argue that the ingot's smooth side was in contact with the mold while its rough side was exposed to the atmosphere. The roughness results from the interaction of the atmosphere and the cooling metal.

== Bronze stands with oxhide ingot depictions ==
In the Late Bronze Age, Cyprus produced numerous bronze stands that depicted a man carrying an oxhide ingot. The stands were designed to hold vases, and they were cast through the lost-wax process. The ingots show the familiar shape of four protruding handles, and the men carry them over their shoulders. These Cypriot stands were exported to Crete and Sardinia, and both islands created similar stands in local bronze workshops.

== Egyptian connections ==
While only one oxhide ingot fragment has been recovered from Egypt (in the context of a LBA smelting workshop), there is a wide array of painted scenes in Egypt that show oxhide ingots. The earliest scene dates to the 15th century BC and the latest scene to the 12th century BC. The ingots display their typical four protrusions, and red paint (which suggests they are copper) is preserved on them. The captions accompanying the scenes explain that the men who bring the ingots come from the north, specifically Retnu (Syria) and Keftiu (unidentified). They are shown being carried on the shoulders of men, sitting with other goods in storage, or as part of scenes in smelting workshops. In a relief from Karnak, the pharaoh Amenhotep II is seen riding a chariot and spearing an oxhide ingot with five arrows. A laudatory caption emphasizing the pharaoh's strength accompanies the scene.

Several of the “Amarna letters” dating to the mid-14th century BC refer to hundreds of copper talents—in addition to goods such as elephant tusks and glass ingots—sent from the kingdom of Alashiya to Egypt. Some scholars identify Cyprus with Alashiya. In particular, the Uluburun cargo is similar to the goods that, according to the letters, Alashiya sent to Egypt.

== See also ==
- Uluburun shipwreck
- History of money
