= Numismatic Museum of Athens =

Coin museum in Athens, Greece

Numismatic Museum, Athens
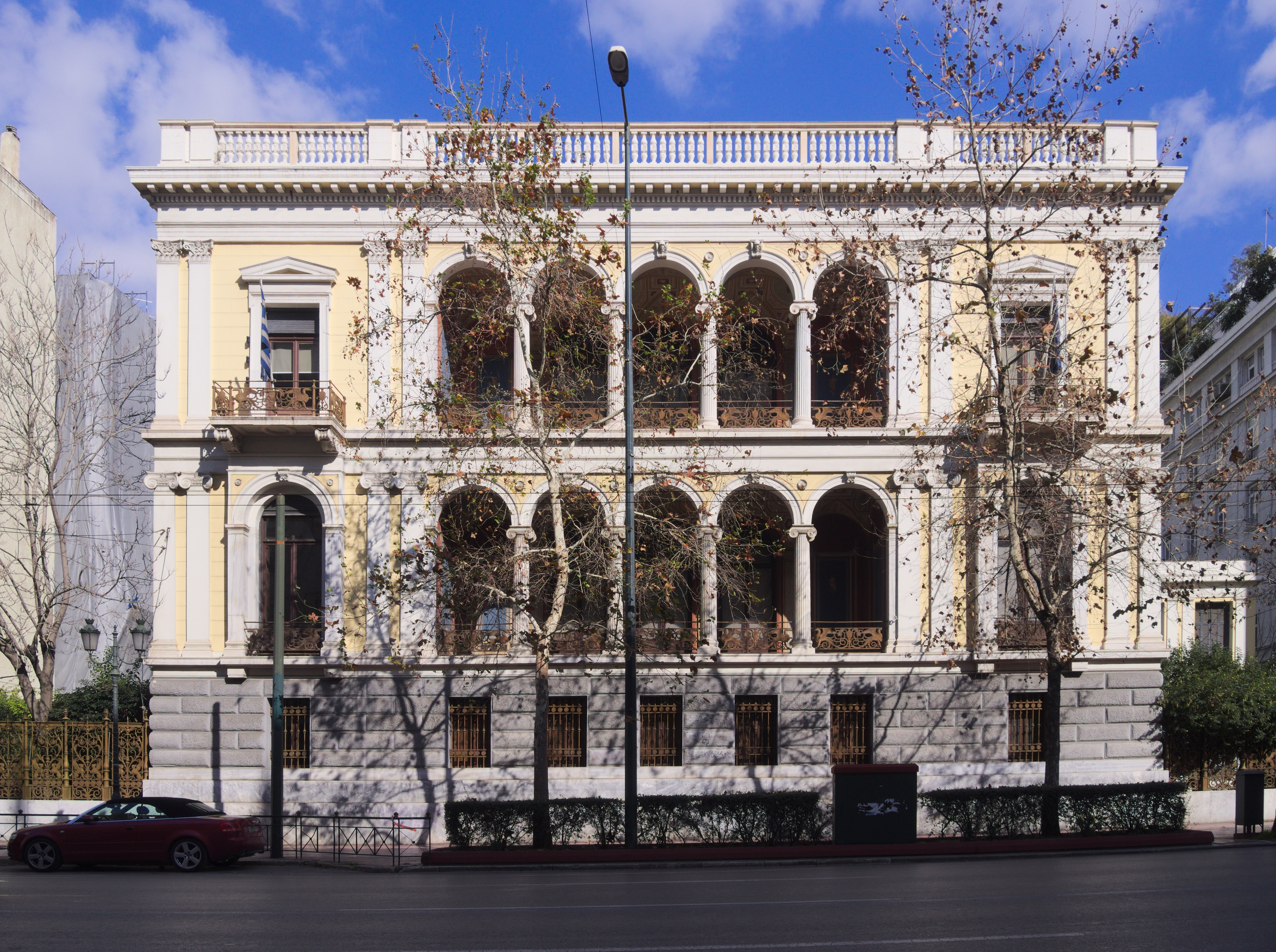
- Iliou Melathron, the former house of Heinrich Schliemann

- Location within Athens
- Interactive fullscreen map
- Location: Panepistimiou Street, Athens, Greece
- Coordinates: 37°58′40″N 23°44′07″E
- Type: Numismatic museum
- Director: Dr. Georgios Kakavas
- Public transit access: Syntagma station; Panepistimio station
- Website: www.nummus.gr

The Numismatic Museum of Athens (Greek: Νομισματικό Μουσείο Αθηνών) is one of the most important museums in Greece, holding a collection of over 500,000 coins, medals, engraved gems, weights, stamps and related artefacts from 1400 BC to modern times. The collection of Ancient Greek coinage is one of the richest in the world, paralleled by those of the British Museum in London, the Bibliothèque Nationale in Paris, the State Hermitage Museum in Saint Petersburg, the Bode Museum in Berlin, and the American Numismatic Society in New York City. The museum itself is housed in the former mansion of the archaeologist Heinrich Schliemann, formally known as Iliou Melathron (Greek: Ιλίου Μέλαθρον, "Palace of Ilion").

The Numismatic Museum is in central Athens, on 12 Panepistimiou Street near Syntagma Square. It is served by the Syntagma metro station. There is a museum shop and a coffeehouse in the garden.

== History ==
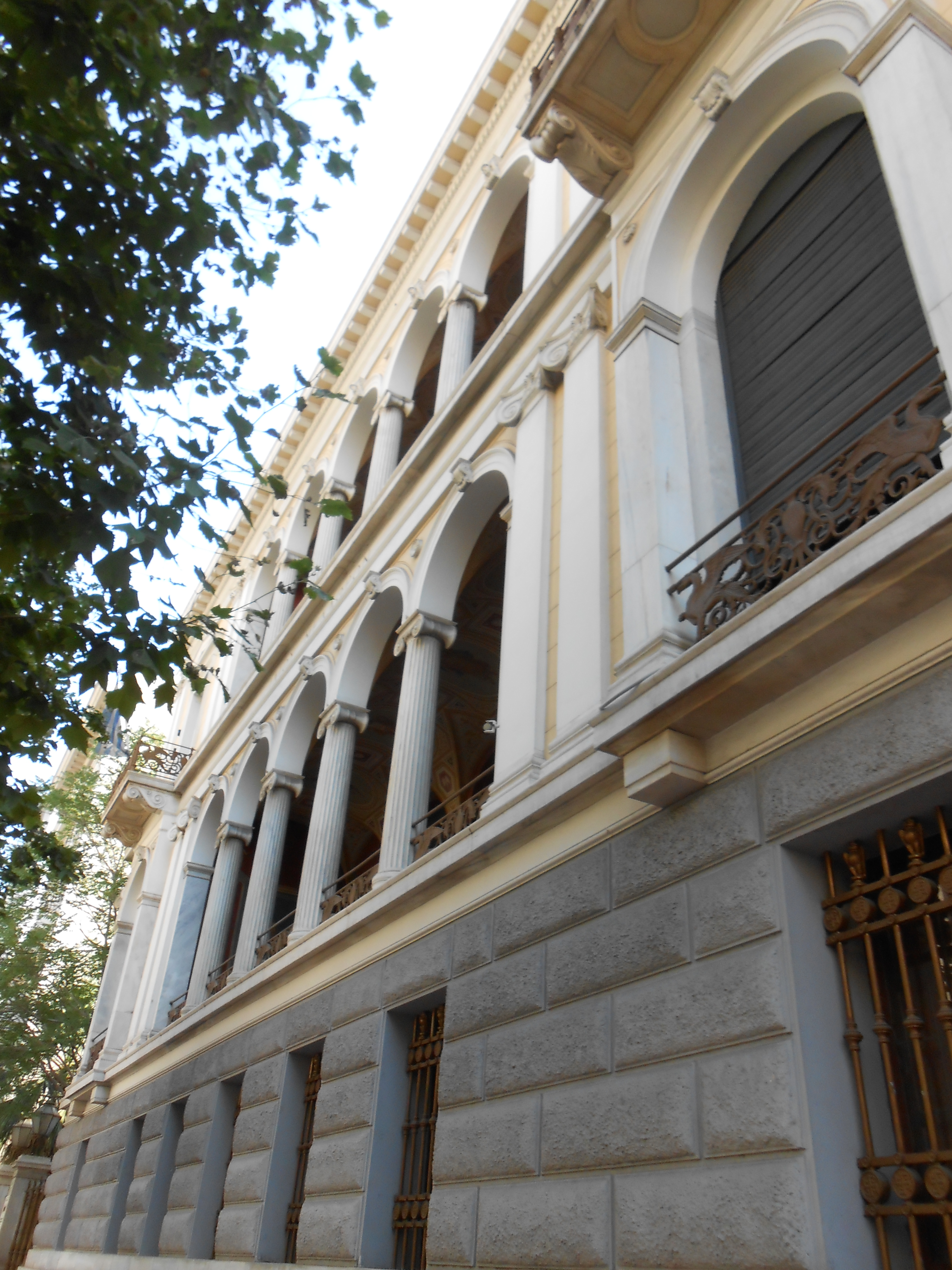
Façade close-up

The first attempts at coin collecting by the state began shortly after the independence of Greece in Aegina. The collection was enriched after excavations, purchases and donations. The museum was founded in 1838, around the same era with the National Archaeological Museum, but it was not until many years after and several decrees that it became an independent organization. Initially, the collection was a part of the National Library of Greece and was kept in the main building of the University of Athens and later at the building of the Academy of Athens where the collection was first exhibited. In 1946, the collection was moved to the National Archaeological Museum. The organization of the museum became twice independent, in 1893 and 1965.

The Iliou Melathron was granted in order to house the collection in 1984, and after a major renovation it finally opened in 1998.

== The Iliou Melathron ==
The building around 1900

The Numismatic Museum now occupies the Iliou Melathron, a three-story building on Panepistimiou Street. It was built between 1878 and 1880 for Heinrich Schliemann and the architect was Ernst Ziller. At the time of its completion, it was considered to be the most magnificent private residence of Athens. Its design was inspired by the Renaissance Revival movement as well as Neoclassicism, while the interior is influenced by the architecture of Pompeii. As a result, the rooms are decorated with mosaics and murals depicting either themes from the Trojan War or Greek mottos. In 1927, Schliemann's widow, Sophia, sold the building to the Greek state; it was subsequently used as the seat of the Council of State and later the Court of Cassation.

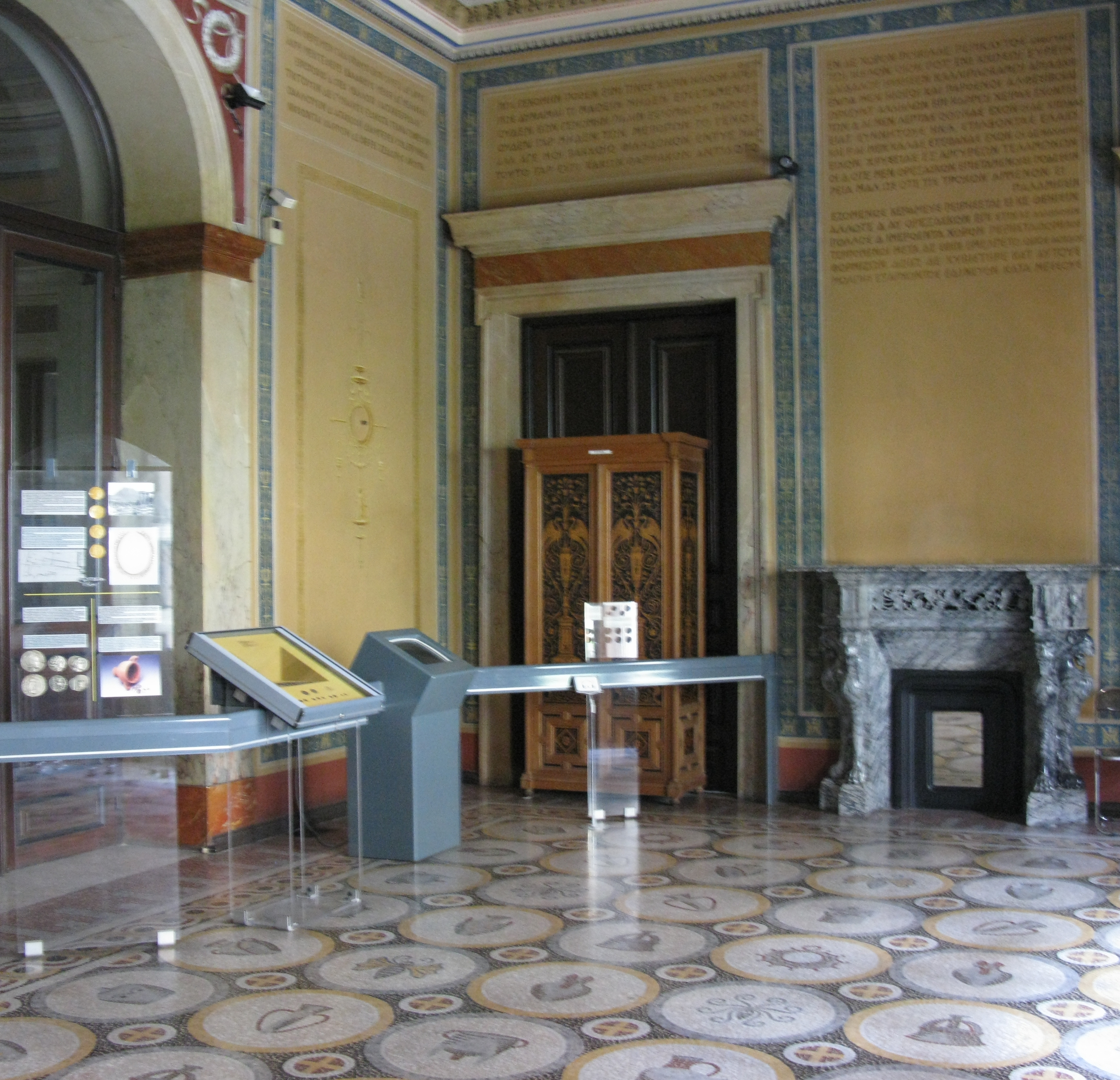
View of the interior of the museum

The use of the building as a courthouse caused much damage. After the building was chosen to house the Numismatic Museum, it underwent a major renovation under which the floor mosaics and the murals were restored. Finally, the numismatic collection was inaugurated in the partly restored building in 1998 while the whole collection became viewable in 2007.

== Collections ==
The collection of the museum contains 600,000 objects, mainly coins but also medals, standard masses, dies, stamps and others, from the 14th century BC until modern times. The collection is arranged in such a way so as to follow the history of coinage. The museum holds a very important collection of Ancient Greek coinage, with coins from the 6th century BC to the 5th century AD, including many from the Greek Poleis and the Hellenistic and Roman periods. There are also major Byzantine and medieval collections from Western Europe, Asia and the Ottoman Empire.

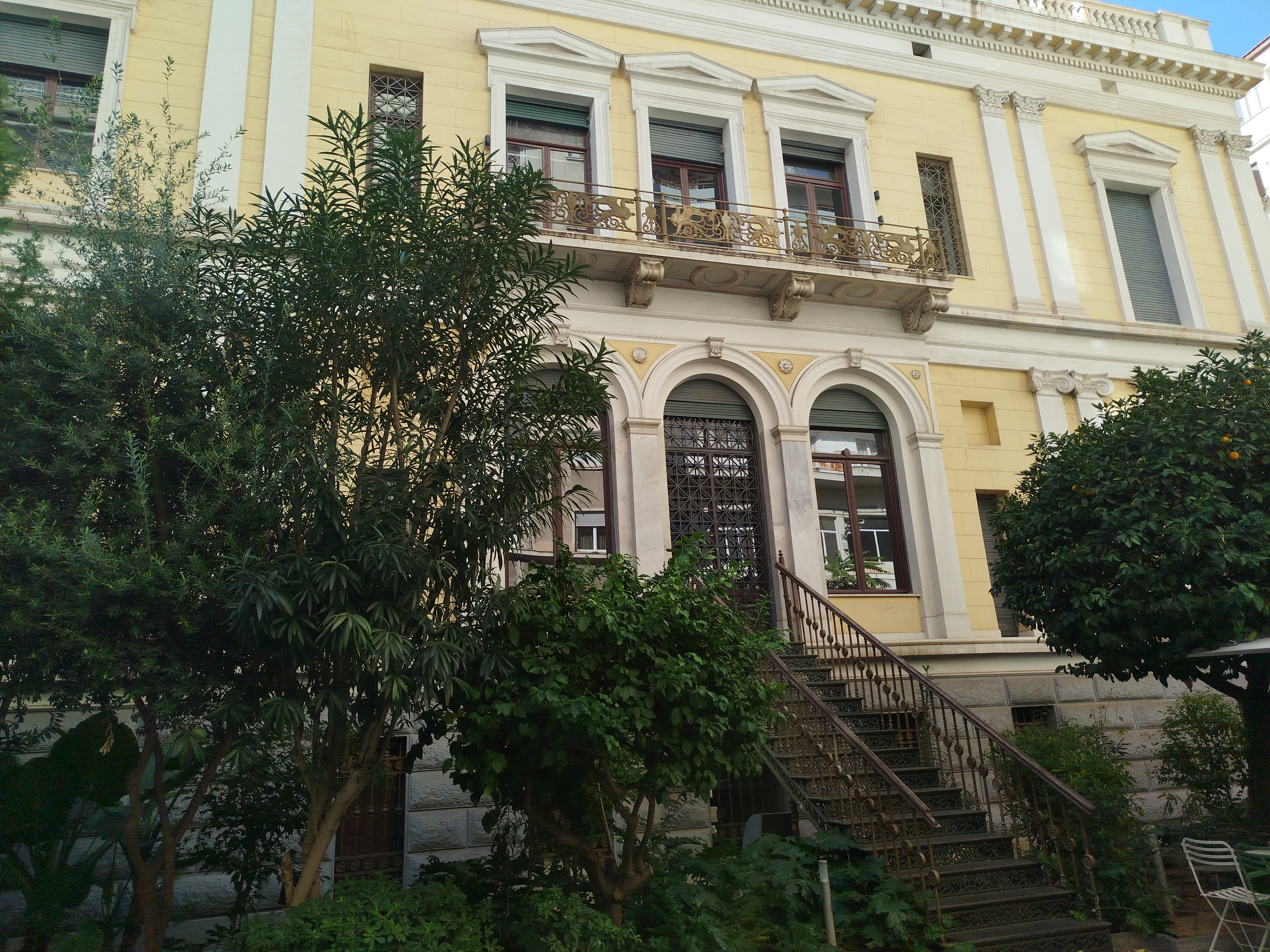
The building as of late 2025

A large portion of the collection is constituted by coins that were found in hoards while the rest comes from the initial collection of Aegina, recent excavations in mainland Greece and donations. Ioannis Svoronos spent his whole career working for the museum. serving as the director from 1899 to his death in 1922.

The museum houses a library of 12,000 books specialized in the study of coinage. There is also a conservation laboratory.

== Gallery ==
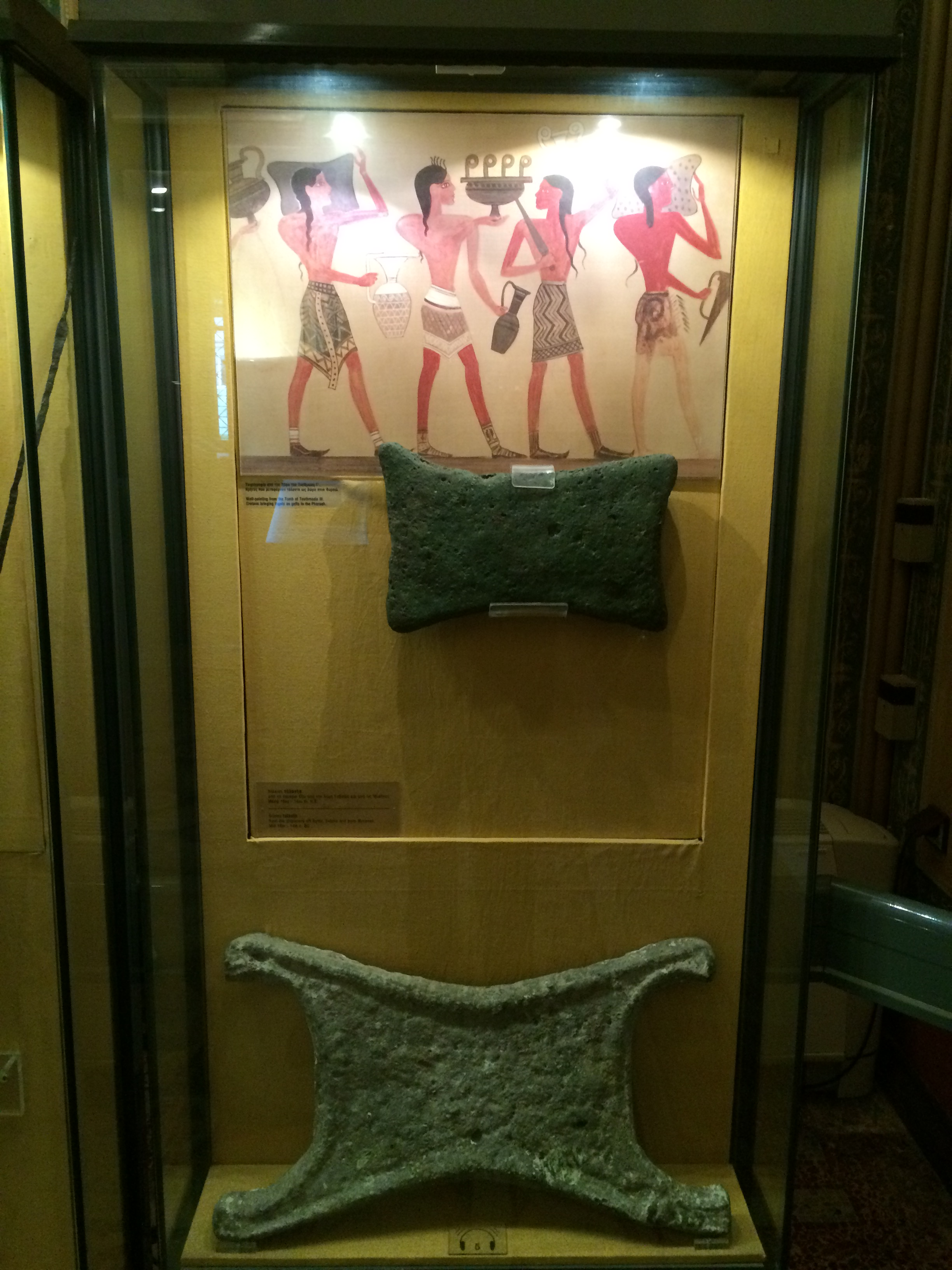
Copper ingots from Crete and Mycenae

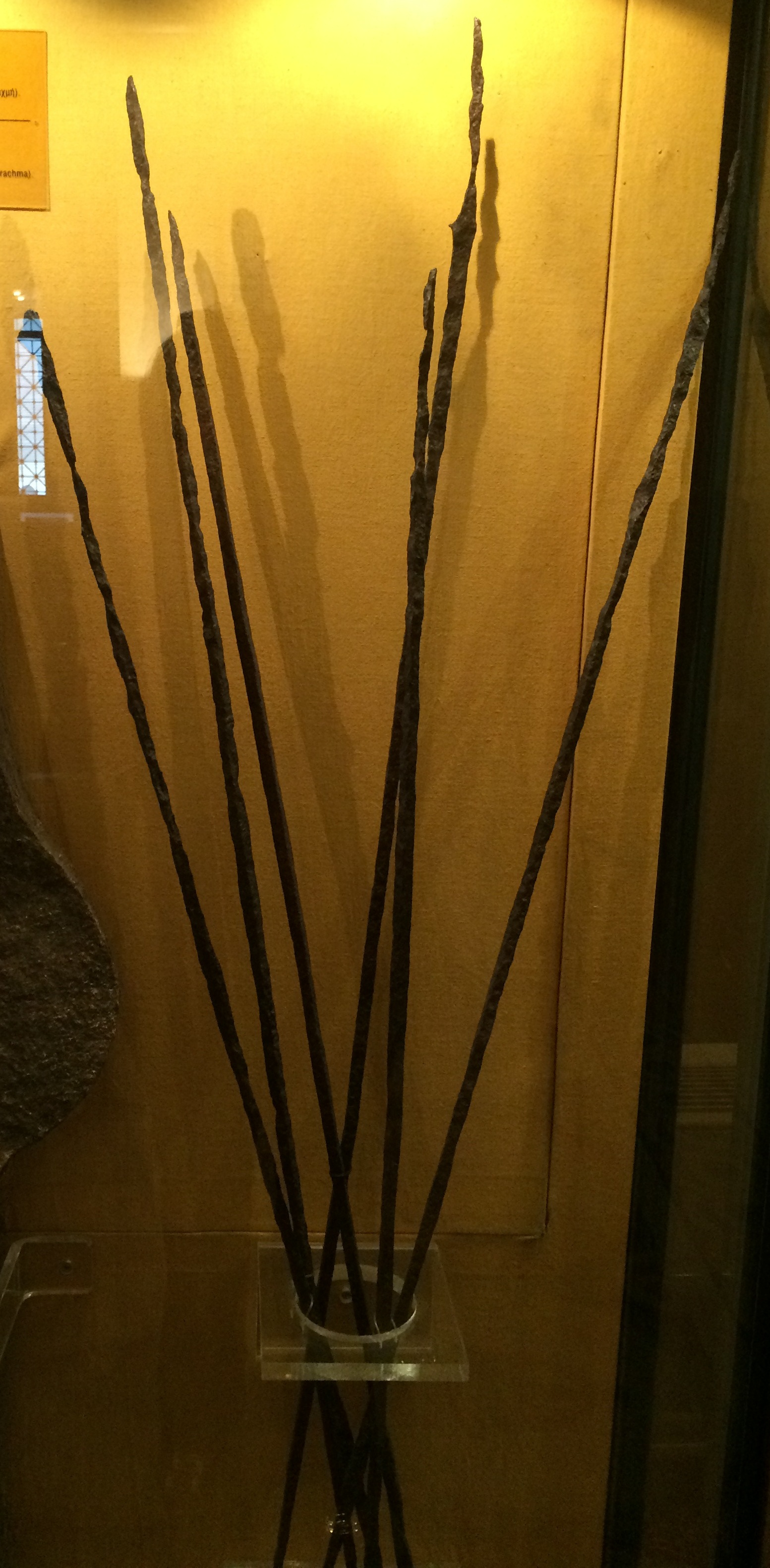
Iron oboloi in the form of spit, uncovered at Heraion of Argos

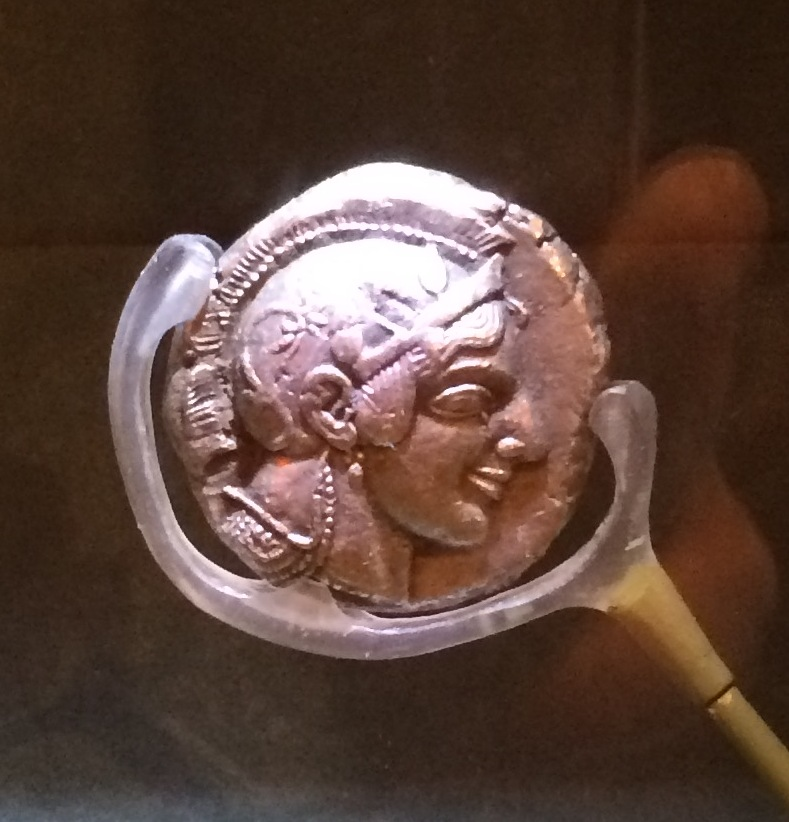
Athens, 467–465 BC. Silver Dekadrachm. Head of Athena right

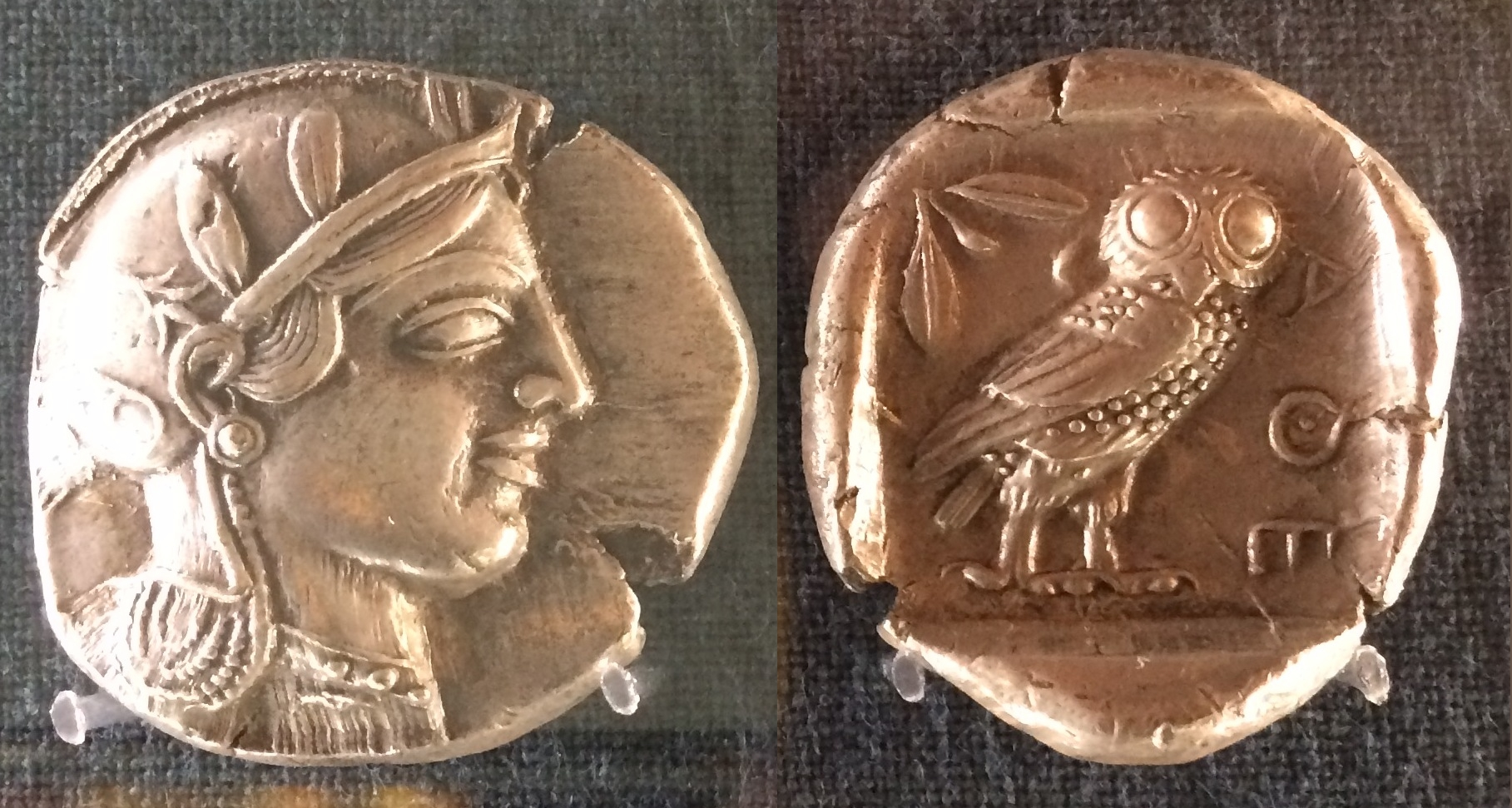
Silver Drachma of Athens. Helmeted head of Athena right / ΑΘΕ (ΑΘΗΝΑΙΩΝ – of Athenians), owl standing right

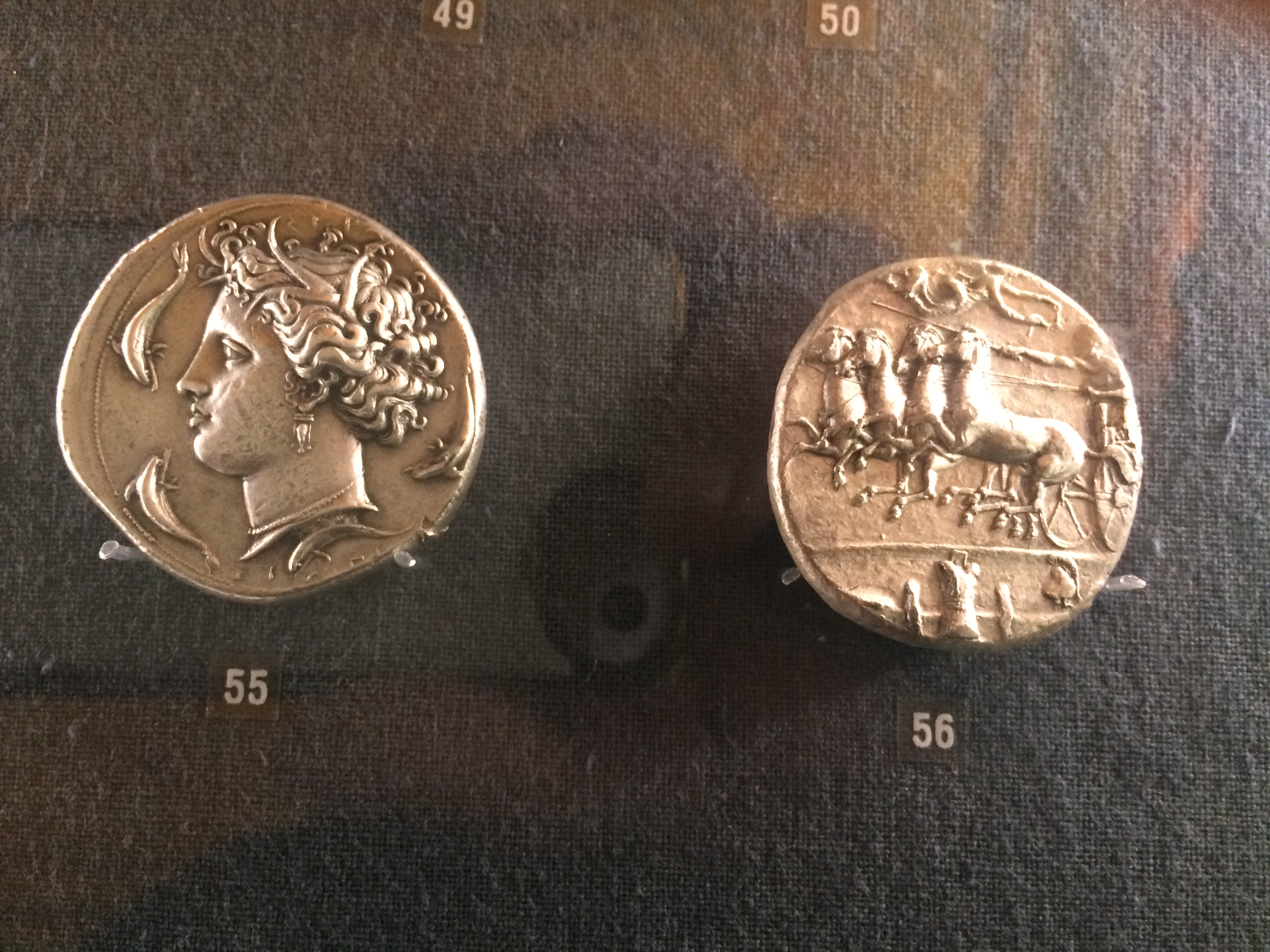
Silver decadrachm from Syracuse, Sicily. Head of Arethusa left, four dolphins around

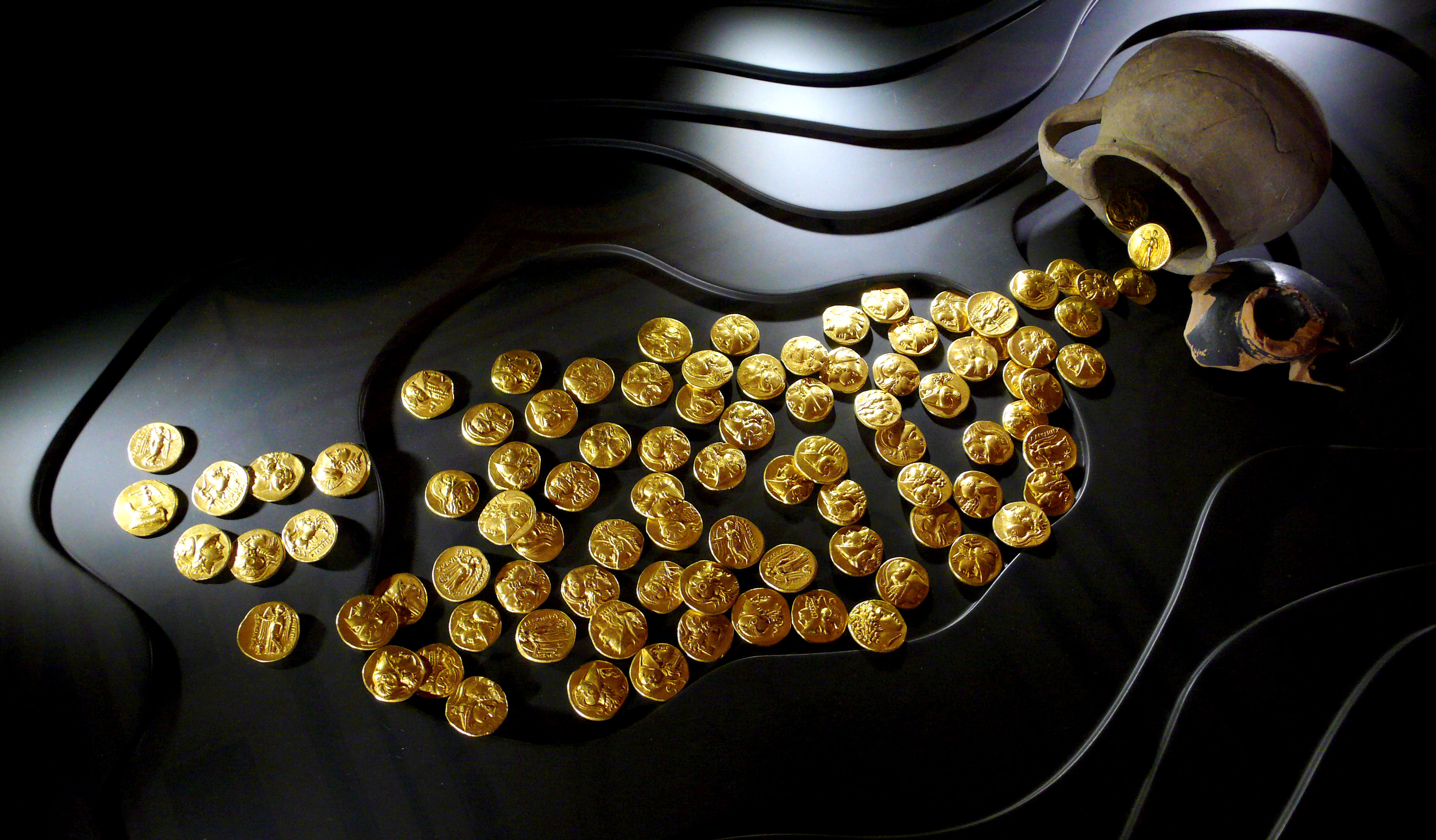
Hoard of gold coins from Epidaurus, 3rd century BC

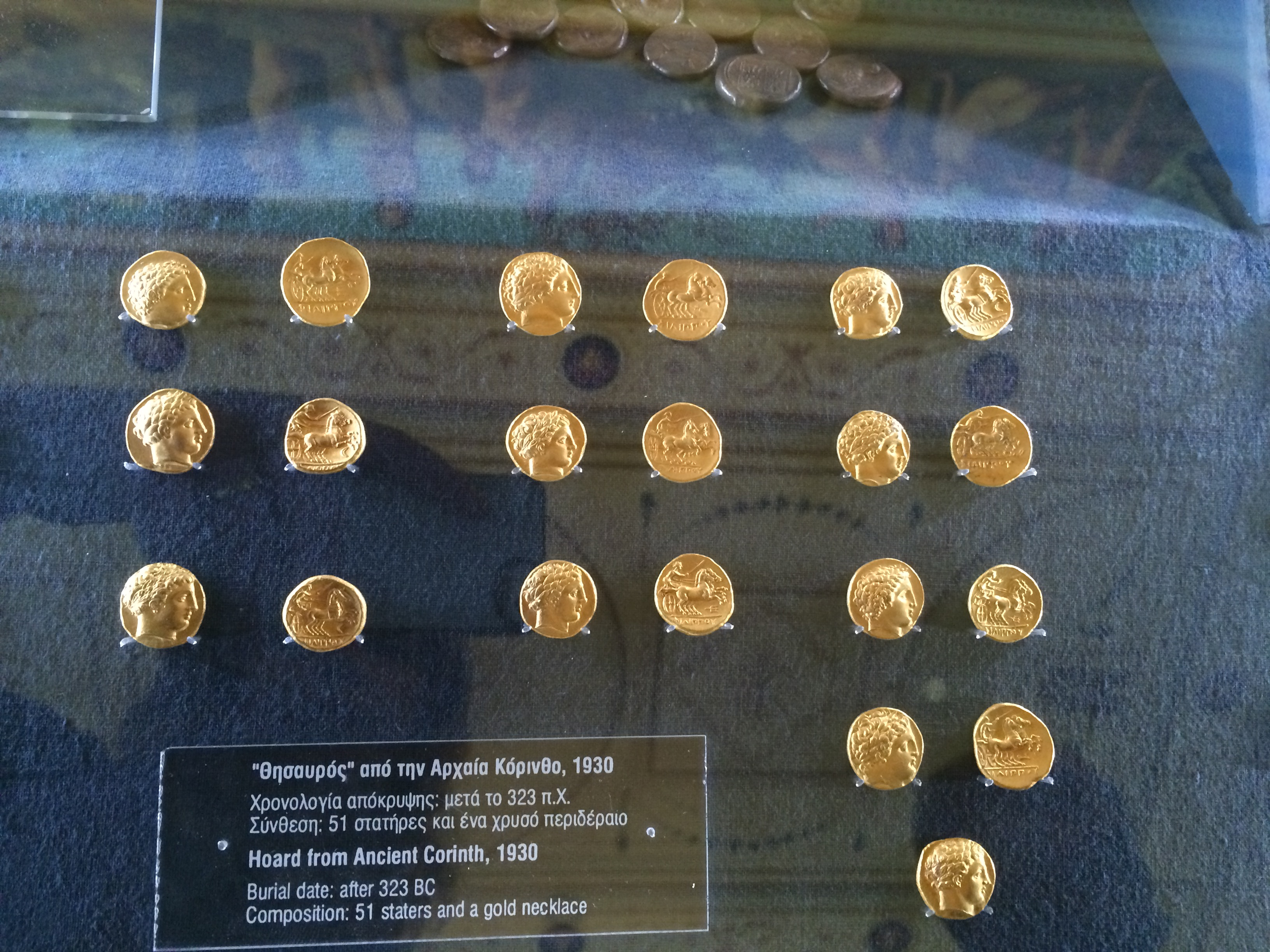
Hoard of gold coins from Ancient Corinth

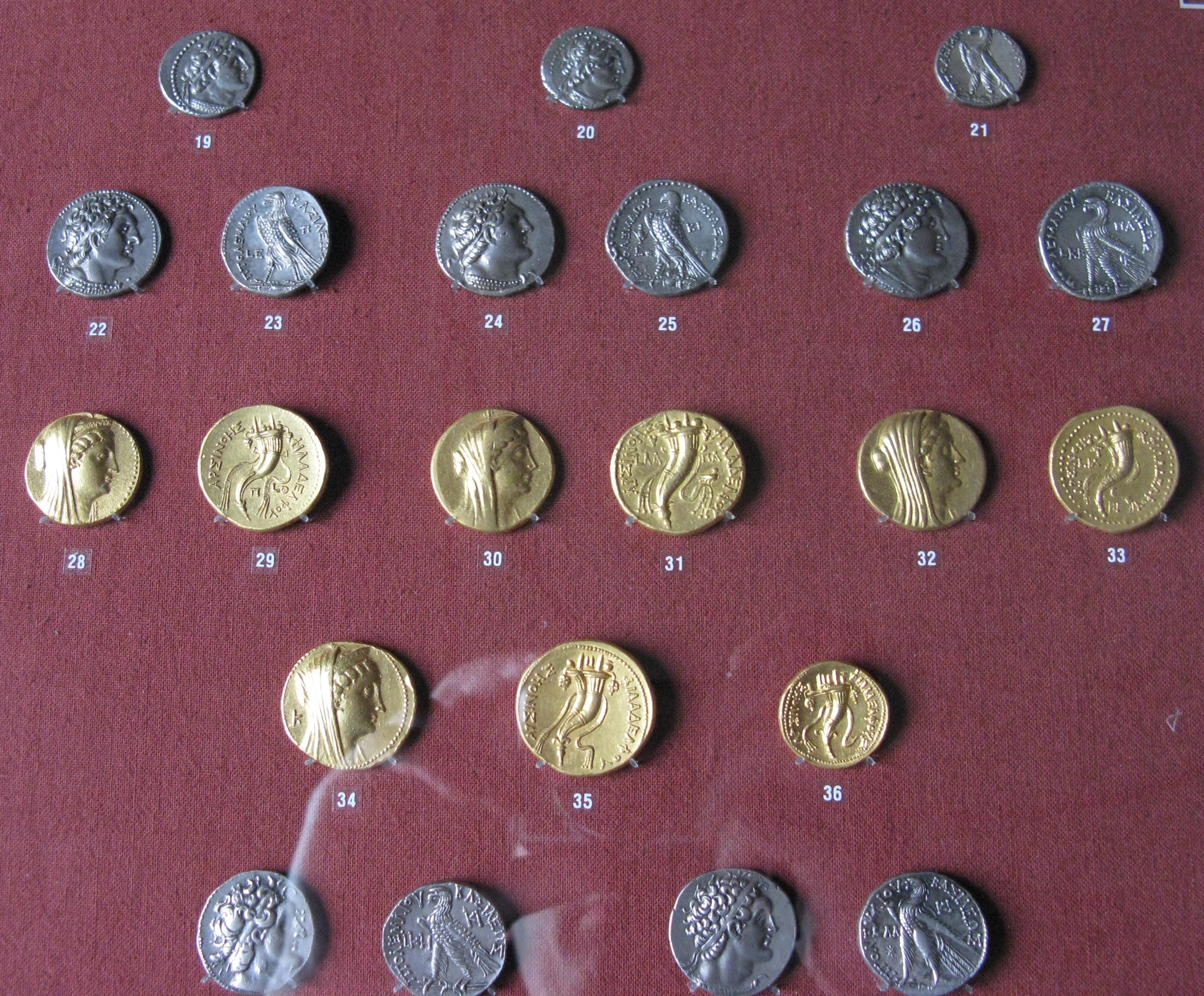
Gold and silver coins of Ptolemies

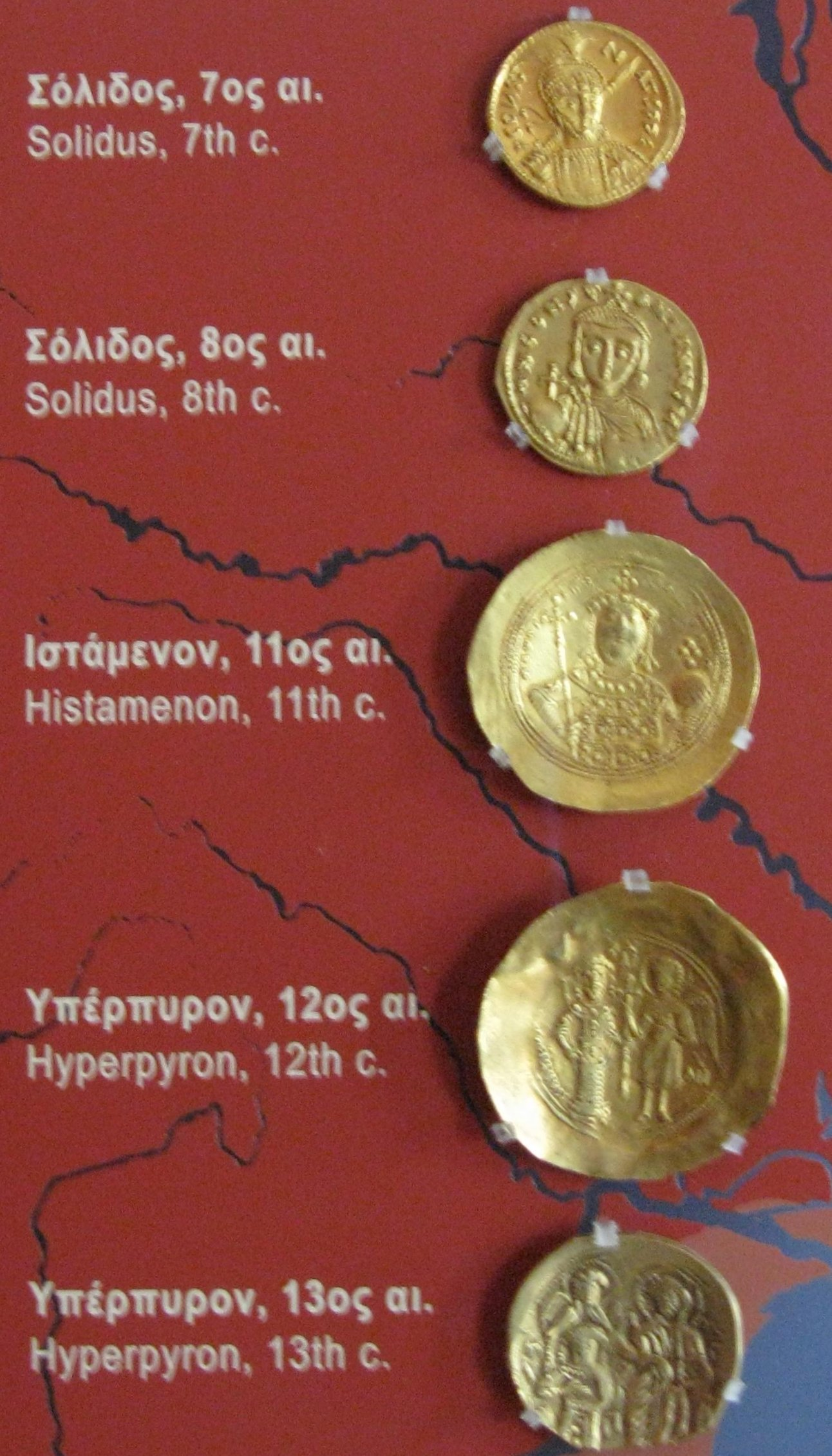
Gold coins of the Byzantine Empire
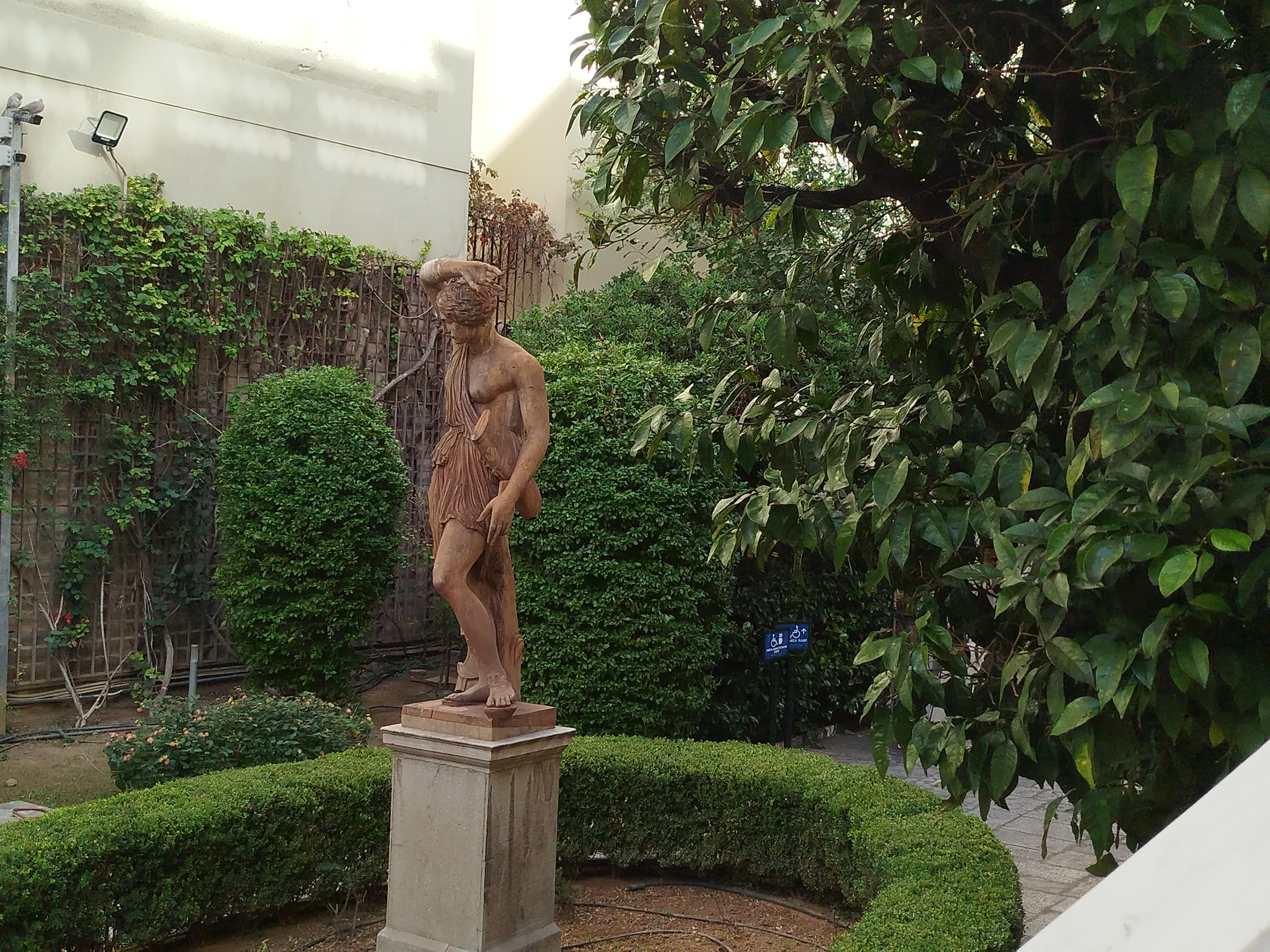
Outdoor Space

== See also ==
- List of museums in Greece
- List of museums with major numismatic collections
