= Košice gold treasure =

Hoard of gold coins and other gold items

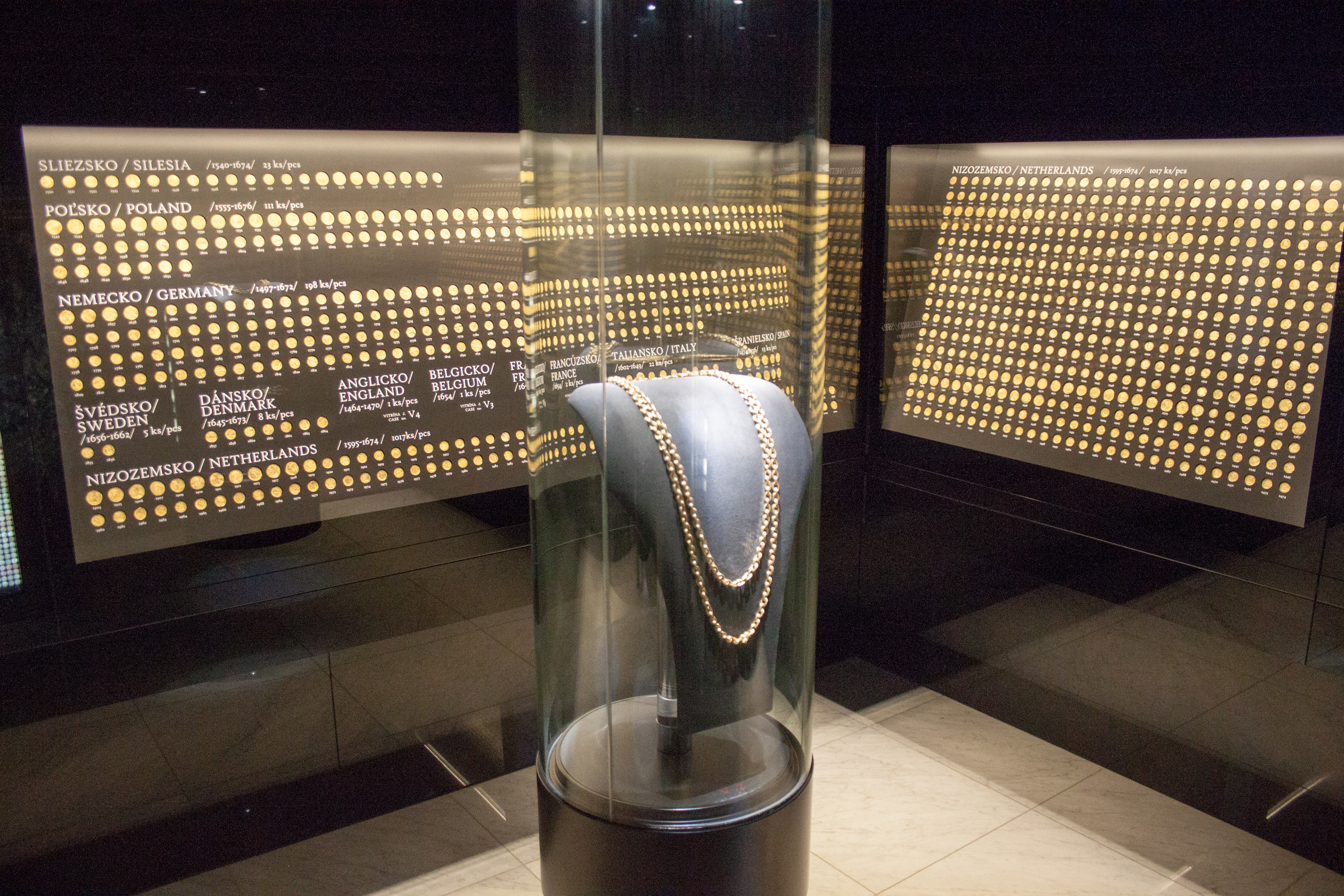
The golden treasure of Košice in the East Slovak Museum

The Košice gold treasure (Slovak: Košický zlatý poklad) is a hoard of 2,920 gold coins, a gold chain from the Renaissance period, three gold medals, and an engraved copper casket, located in Košice, Slovakia. It was discovered on 24 August 1935, during reconstruction work in the cellar of the financial directorate building in the city center of Košice. It is the largest gold treasure ever found in Slovakia.

== Discovery ==
The Košice gold treasure was discovered on August 24, 1935, by a 34-year-old construction worker during renovation work at Hlavná ulica 68 (i.e. 68 Main Street) in Košice, Slovakia. While excavating the foundations to a depth of approximately 1.4 meters, Peter Stachow struck a hard object with his pickaxe. The object proved to be a copper chest containing a large amount of gold. A commission examined and sealed the treasure, which was then secured in the treasury of the Slovak Bank in Košice, with police maintaining a presence to manage the growing crowd and prevent any looting until the evening of the discovery. Details of the find first appeared in local newspapers on the morning of 25 August 1935.

The hoard was initially kept in the Finance Directorate building in Košice, and later it was moved to the General Treasury and the Regional Museum (now part of the Slovak National Museum) in Bratislava, where the coins were inventoried for the first time. In 1940, the hoard was transferred to the Central Treasury and subsequently deposited in the numismatic department of the National Museum in Prague, where detailed description and analysis continued until 1942. During the Second World War, government circles in the Third Reich and the Kingdom of Hungary, including Reich Marshal Hermann Göring, State Secretary to the Reich Protector Karl Hermann Frank, and the Hungarian head of state Miklós Horthy, took an interest in the hoard. Therefore, it was packed into two crates and buried at a secret location near Prague.

The treasure was found in a Renaissance copper box in the shape of a loaf, which consists of two interlocking bowls. The upper bowl is decorated with an engraved hunting motif. The massive Renaissance chain is 2.14 meters long and weighs 590 grams. The find contains three gold medals. Two date from 1526 and 1544 with a motif of King Louis II. The third medal, dating from 1541, is the most precious. It is the work of Kristof Füss and is an equestrian medal of King Ferdinand I. Among the coins there is one that does not fit into the set of other contemporary coins. It is probably an ancient Thracian coin. However, it could also be its Celtic imitation. The other contemporary coins are of both domestic (Hungary, Transylvania) and foreign provenance (Holland, Bohemia, Silesia, Austrian lands, Germany, Poland, Italy, Sweden and Spain). It is speculated that the box was originally hidden in Košice during the anti-Hasburg revolts, however no official records are able prove the claim.

== Contents ==
=== Coins ===
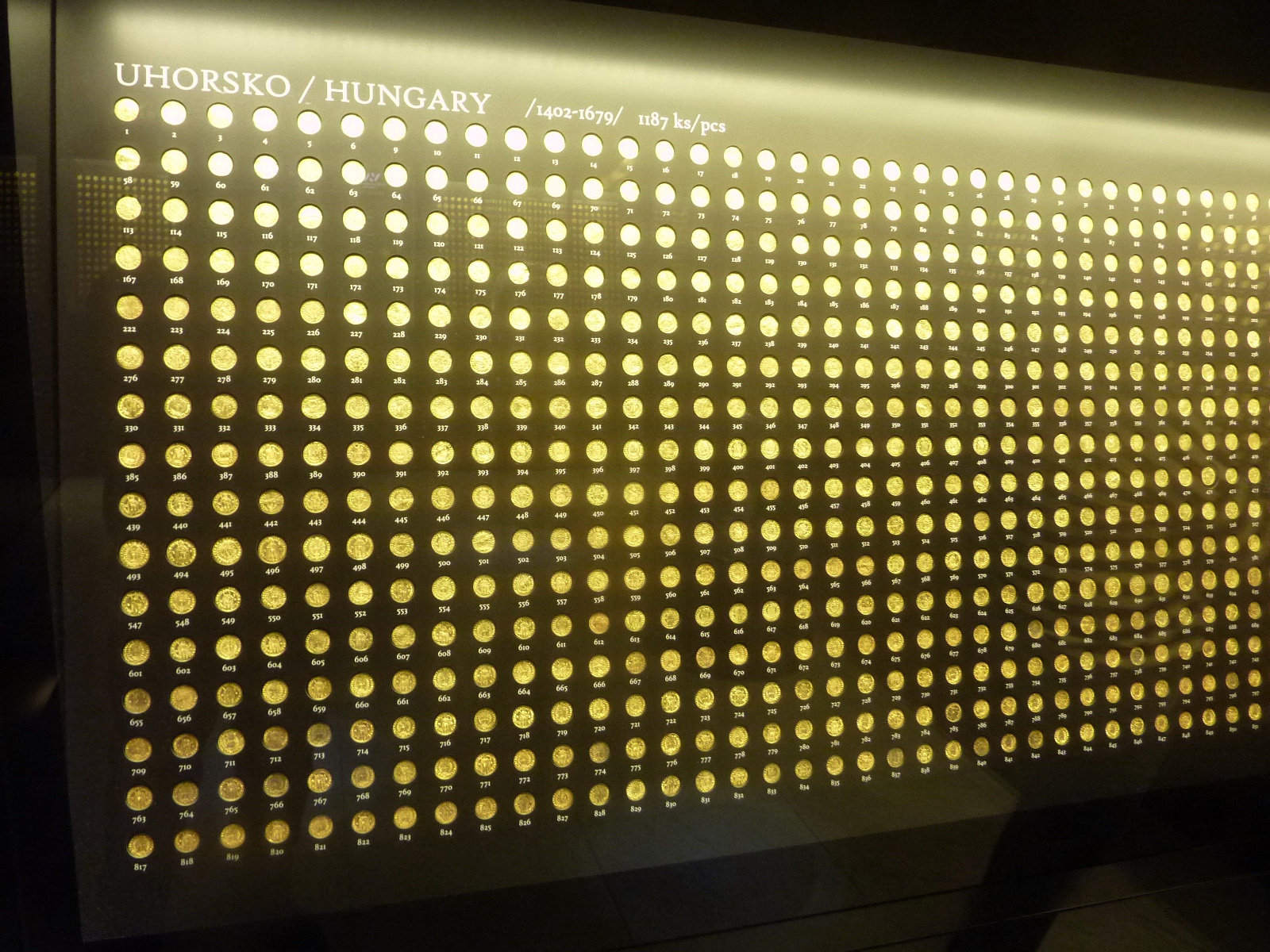
The treasure's coins that originated from the Kingdom of Hungary

The Košice gold treasure primarily consists of gold ducats, which form the dominant coin type in the hoard of approximately 2,920 coins. These ducats were minted across various Central European regions, with a significant portion originating from the Kremnica mint in Slovakia, a key local facility under Habsburg control that produced high-quality gold coins during the period. Other notable issues include Hungarian ducats, which number around 1,187 pieces and reflect rulers from the 15th to 17th centuries, as well as coins from Transylvania (251 pieces) and Bohemia (26 pieces).

The coins span a date range from the early 15th century to the late 17th century, with the earliest examples including 15 gold florins from the reign of King Sigismund (1368–1437), minted between 1402 and 1404 in various facilities, and the latest comprising 28 ducats of Emperor Leopold I (1658–1705) struck in 1679 at the Kremnica mint. This temporal spread highlights a mix of origins, including Habsburg-dominated mints in Austrian territories (24 coins) and local Slovak production at Kremnica, alongside influences from Ottoman-vassal regions like Transylvania, which produced coins under mixed political control. Additional sources encompass Dutch ducats (1,015 pieces from the provincial period), Polish issues (38 coins), and smaller groups from Salzburg (31 coins), Silesia (22 coins), and even Spain (13 coins), totaling coins from 81 different mints across Europe.

== Exhibitions ==
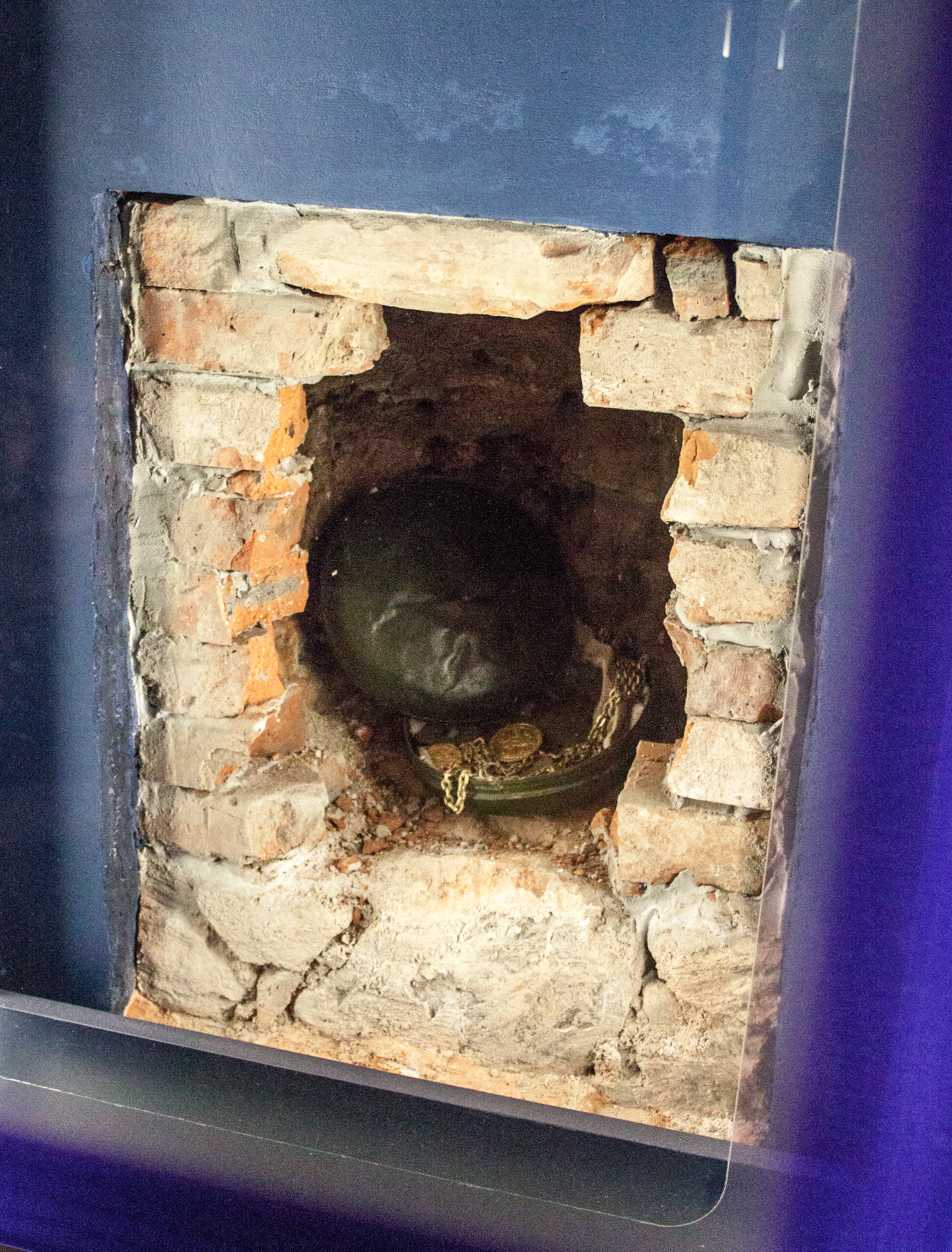
Replica of the site where the Košice gold treasure was first found

Temporary exhibitions have included a showing select items at the National Museum in Prague in 2009. Traveling exhibits occurred in Bratislava Castle in 2009.

The treasure has been on permanent display at the East Slovak Museum in Košice since 2013, forming a part of the museum's historical exhibitions. Conservation efforts have focused on preserving the artifacts in controlled environments to prevent oxidation and degradation, with the items stored in climate-regulated conditions at the East Slovak Museum.
