= RBI Monetary Museum =

Museum in India

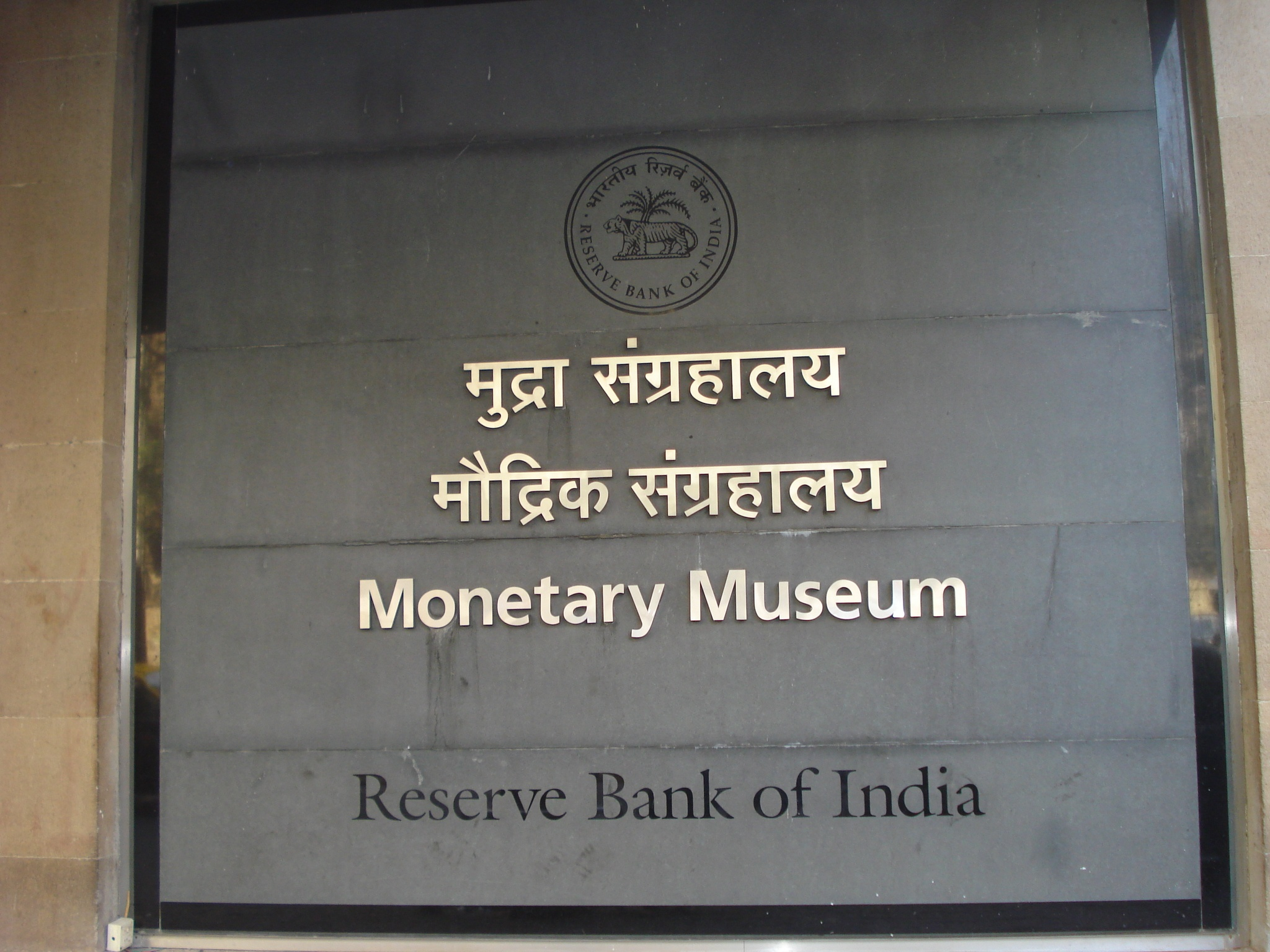
- Location: Amar Building, Ground Floor; Sir Phirozshah Mehta Road; Fort, Mumbai - 400001
- Coordinates: 18.934107°N 72.836547°E
- Type: Numismatics, Economic history
- Collections: Ancient cowries, coins, paper money, financial instruments
- Collection size: 1,500
- Owner: Reserve Bank of India
- Public transit access: Chhatrapati Shivaji Terminus; Churchgate
- Website: m.rbi.org.in//Scripts/ic_museum.aspx

RBI Monetary Museum or Reserve Bank of India Monetary Museum is a museum in Fort, Mumbai that covers the evolution of money in India, from the earliest barter system and the use of cowries to paper money, coins, publicly listed shares and modern-day electronic transactions.

== History ==
The museum was established under the educational programme by the Reserve Bank of India, India's central bank, in 2004 and was inaugurated by A. P. J. Abdul Kalam, the then President of India. It was the first museum in the country devoted to economic history and numismatics.

The collection, divided into six sections, has about 1,500 objects that include coins dating back to 6th-century BCE and from Indus Valley, the Kushana Empire, the Gupta period and the British Raj; ancient paper money from across India, China and Southeast Asia; financial instruments; and other interactive exhibits. Entry to the museum is free.
