= Pythion of Megara =

Pythion of Megara (died c. 446 BC) was a citizen of Megara who was commemorated for his courage in battle and for saving three Athenian tribes from death. His existence is known from an inscription on a commemorative stele found in the grave area outside the Acharnian Gate in Classical Athens. Pythion's actions are significant within the context of the campaigns in 446 BC that marked the closing stages of the First Peloponnesian War, and the stele as an object in itself is significant.

== Stele ==
The gravestone was found among the graves in the necropolis outside the Acharnian Gate in Athens. It was defaced and re-purposed as building material in a modern building. A fragment from the left side broke off after antiquity and was rediscovered separately. It currently resides in the Epigraphical Museum.

The text constitutes a mix of Attic and Doric word forms in Ionic lettering - it is in a non-stoichedon style. The content is composed in nine hexameters, each marked with a vertical stroke. The naming of the three Athenian tribes which Pythion saved is in prose.

The original text of the inscription is published with translation, below, in R. Osborne and P. J. Rhodes Greek Historical Inscriptions 478-404 BC, Oxford University Press (2017).

== Translation ==
This is the memorial lying on the tomb of an excellent man,
Pythion from Megara, who slew seven men and broke off
seven spears in their bodies: he chose virtue and brought
honour to his father among the people.
This man, who saved three tribes of Athenians, bringing them from Pegae through Boeotia to Athens, brought
honour to Andocides with two thousand captives (or slaves?).
He harmed none of the men on earth, and went down to
Hades blessed for all to see.
These are the tribes: Pandionis, Cecropis, Antiochis.

== Historical significance ==
In Thucydides, Euboea rose in revolt against the Athenians and Pericles took an army there to put it down. Megara revolted soon after and killed the Athenian garrison installed there after Megara appealed to them for help in a conflict against Corinth. Pericles was forced to return from Euboea when Attica was invaded soon after by a Peloponnesian force under Pleistoanax, an Agiad King of Sparta. The invading force stopped short of Athens, however, and returned after only reaching Eleusis. While Thucydides gives no historical account of a conflict referred to in the inscription, Diodorus Siculus mentions an Athenian force invading the Megarid and defeating the Megarians. The three tribes mentioned in the inscription were the force used in that campaign, led an unusual route to Athens via Boeotia in order to avoid Pleistoanax's invading force.

Pagae was a harbour belonging to the Megarians in the Gulf of Corinth which Athens acquired under the agreement between the two poleis when they allied c. 461. The route that Pythion guided the Athenians round, in order to avoid Pleistoanax's invading army, was via Aegosthena and Creusis - as discussed by N. G. L Hammond. These events formed part of the First Peloponnesian War, and are a stage in the decline of Athens' imperial ambitions in the Peloponnese. In the winter of 446 - 445 BC, soon after the events this inscription describes, Athens and Sparta (the latter the traditional ally of Megara) entered into the 'Thirty Years Peace' - a peace treaty that reassigned Megara to the Peloponnesian League and redistributed other contested areas to the Athenian and Spartan alliances.

This inscription confirms Diodorus's account of a separate conflict between Athens and Megara, strengthening his historical legitimacy and weakening that of Thucydides, who leaves this expedition out. It shows, too, active Athenian action in the retention of territories gained peacefully through treaties. The Athenian Alliance was a body separate from the Delian League, an allied group of Greek-speaking states of mainly Ionic ethnicity which Athens controlled, and which Athens sought to bring Peloponnesian states into as part of a programme to expand and disrupt the Spartan hegemony of the Peloponnese.

The Andocides mentioned in the inscription was the grandfather of the famous Athenian orator Andocides, and was instrumental in negotiating the Thirty Years Peace.

The tribes of Pandionis, Kekropis and Antiochis are ordered in the inscription according to the regular order of the tribes (III, VII, X respectively). The weighted use of some tribes in individual conflicts, like in this case, made organisational sense but could lead to disproportionate losses for some tribes compared with the whole population of Attica.

We do not know who Pythion of Megara was other than a citizen of Megara, and a saviour of three Athenian tribes. A birth date is impossible to discern, and his death could fall anywhere between 446 - 425 BC - based on the style of the lettering.

That Pythion of Megara has a private gravestone referring to events in 446 BC is highly unusual. Private gravestones with epigrams before c. 430 BC were incredibly rare in Athens. That this stele was likely erected before 430-25 BC is significant, that it is composed of nine hexameters is more so, that it was erected for a foreigner is extraordinary. Whilst it was a private gravestone, it is suggestive of gratitude from the Athenians. The three tribes are named as the primary beneficiaries of Pythion's actions, but Athens as a whole is also an implicit beneficiary. Such an unusual gravestone confers a political meaning; perhaps in light of the Thirty Years Peace of 446-5 BC this stele was a symbol of Athenian influence and sympathy in the Peloponnese despite Sparta's hegemony there.
