= Salamis Tablet =

Ancient Greek counting board found in 1846

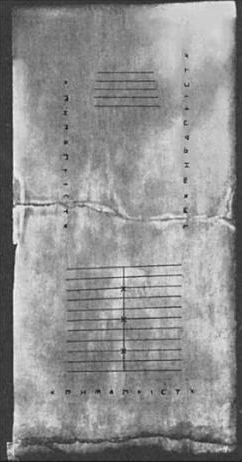
An early photograph of the Salamis Tablet, 1899. The original is marble and is held by the National Museum of Epigraphy, in Athens.

The Salamis Tablet is a marble counting board (an early counting device) dating from around 300 BC, that was discovered on the island of Salamis in 1846. A precursor to the abacus, it is thought that it represents an ancient Greek means of performing mathematical calculations common in the ancient world. Pebbles (Latin: calculi) were placed at various locations and could be moved as calculations were performed. The marble tablet measures approximately 150 × 75 × 4.5 cm.

== Discovery ==
Originally thought to be a gaming board, the slab of white marble is currently at the Epigraphical Museum in Athens.

== Description ==
Five groups of markings appear on the tablet. The three sets of Greek symbols arranged along the left, right and bottom edges of the tablet are numbers from the acrophonic system. In the center of the tablet – a set of five parallel lines equally divided by a vertical line, capped with a semicircle at the intersection of the bottom-most horizontal line and the single vertical line. Below a wide horizontal crack is another group of eleven parallel lines. These are divided into two sections by a line perpendicular to them but with the semicircle at the top of the intersection; the third, sixth and ninth of these lines are marked with a cross where they intersect with the vertical line.

== Numerical representations ==
As with other counting boards and abaci, each counter represents one unit of a magnitude determined by position. The precise interpretation of counters and methods used with the tablet is unknown, but it is possible that use was similar to medieval European counting boards in which counters on the lines represented powers of ten and counters between the lines represented 5 times the previous line.

Retired engineer and high school teacher Stephen Stephenson (1942–2022) speculated that counters placed on either side of the dividing line might represent positive and negative quantities, and that the smaller area at the "top" (as shown in the picture above) of the tablet might represent the exponent of a floating-point number, with the larger area at the "bottom" representing the mantissa.

== Calculations ==
On this board, physical markers (indicators) were placed on the various rows or columns that represented different values. The indicators were not physically attached to the board.

On the tablet Greek numbers are represented. Already in the Ionian time period number systems were responsible for the written use, which became necessary because of the expanding commercial activity.

Two different number systems were developed, the older Attic or Herodian number system and the younger, Milesian system.

The two number systems differed in their use: the Attic predominantly served the commercial life for the adjustment of funds and goods data as well as for the designation of the columns on the abacus. For written calculations the Attic numeral system was unsuitable. The Milesian number system, with which one likewise assigned numbers to letters of the alphabet, was better suited for scientific mathematics. For example, Archimedes and Diophantus used the Milesian system.

The Greek writer Herodotus (485–425 BC) reports in his travels through Egypt that the Egyptians calculated from right to left, contrary to the Greek custom of left to right. This may refer to moving pebbles on the counting board.

== See also ==
- Roman abacus
