= Counting board =

Early computing device

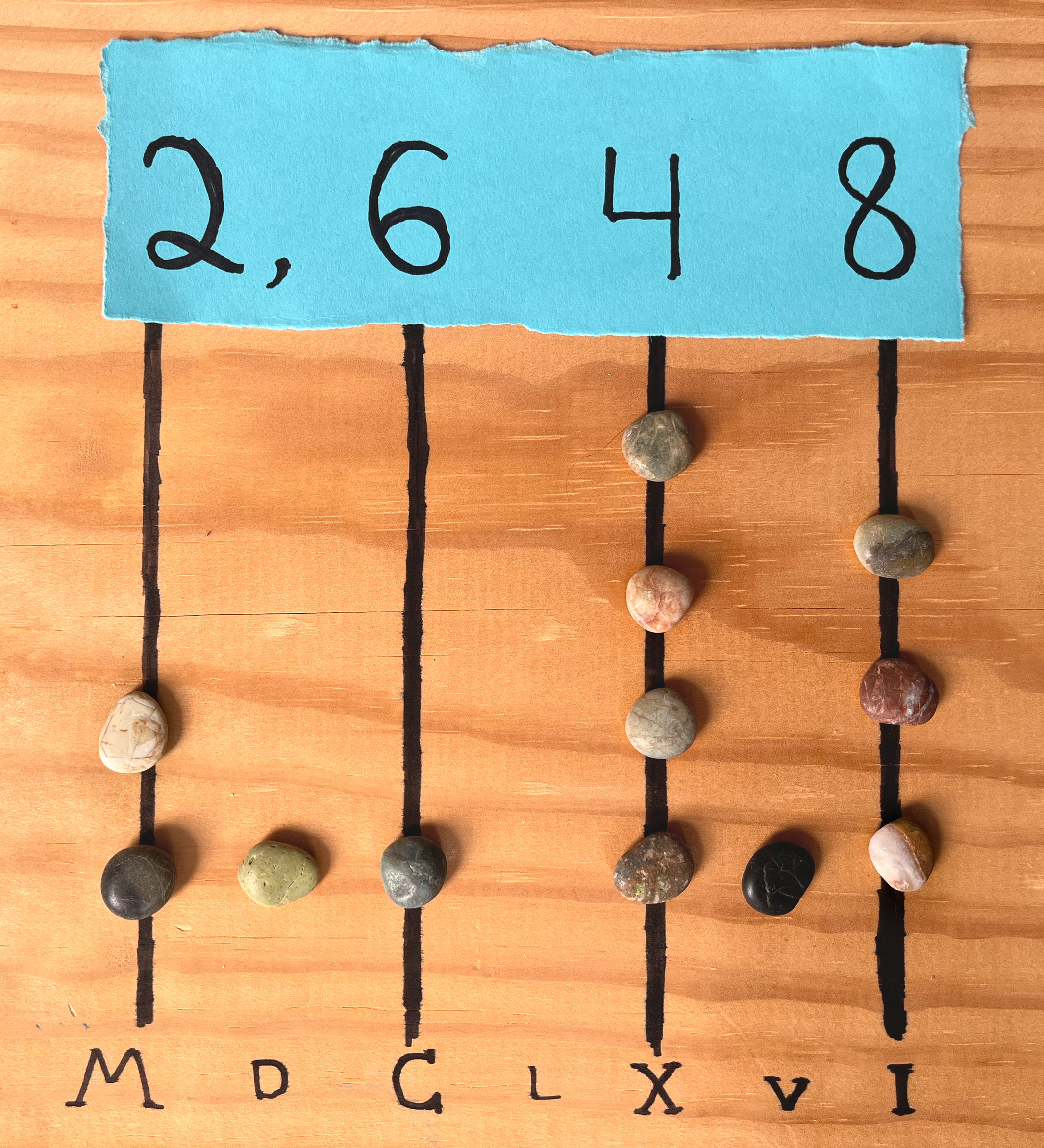
This simple counting board consists of a wooden board with lines drawn on it, with pebbles (Latin: calculi) used as counters. Lines represent powers of ten and spaces between the lines represent 5 times the adjacent power of ten. The pictured number is 2,648, or in Roman numerals, MMDCXXXXVIII. The exact form and use of common ancient counting boards is not known, as few ancient counting boards and no ancient written instructions have survived.

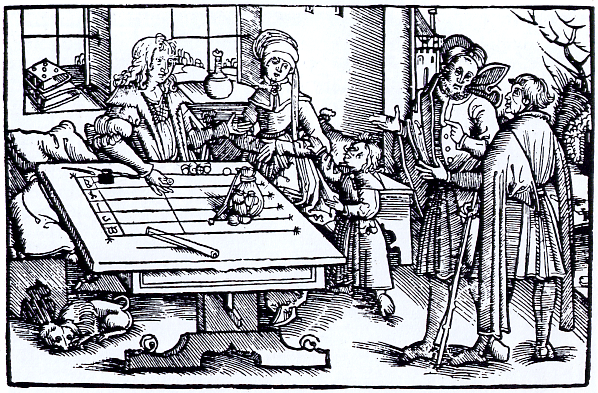
Rechentisch/Counting board (engraving probably from Strasbourg)

The counting board is the precursor of the abacus, and the earliest known form of a counting device (excluding fingers and other very simple methods). Counting boards were made of stone or wood, and the counting was done on the board with beads, pebbles etc. Not many boards survive because of the perishable materials used in their construction, or the impossibility to identify the object as a counting board. The counting board was invented to facilitate and streamline numerical calculations in ancient civilizations. Its inception addressed the need for a practical tool to perform arithmetic operations efficiently. By using counters or tokens on a board with designated sections, people could easily keep track of quantities, trade, and financial transactions. This invention not only enhanced accuracy but also fueled the development of more sophisticated mathematical concepts and systems throughout history.

The counting board does not include a zero, as we have come to understand it today. It primarily used Roman numerals to calculate. The system was based on a base ten or base twenty system, where the lines represented the bases of ten or twenty, and the spaces representing base fives.

The oldest known counting board, the Salamis Tablet (c. 300 BC) was discovered on the Greek island of Salamis in 1899. It is thought to have been used as more of a gaming board than a calculating device. It is marble, about 150 x 75 x 4.5 cm, and is in the Epigraphical Museum in Athens. It has carved Greek letters and parallel grooves.

The German mathematician Adam Ries described the use of counting boards in Rechenbuch auf Linien und Ziphren in allerlei Handthierung / geschäfften und Kaufmanschafft.

== See also ==
- Calculator
- Reckoning board
