= Roman abacus =

Base-10 portable abacus

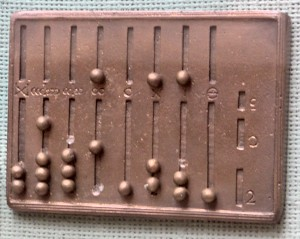
A reconstruction of a Roman hand abacus, made by the RGZ Museum in Mainz, 1977. The original is bronze and is held by the Bibliothèque nationale de France, in Paris. This example is missing many counter beads.

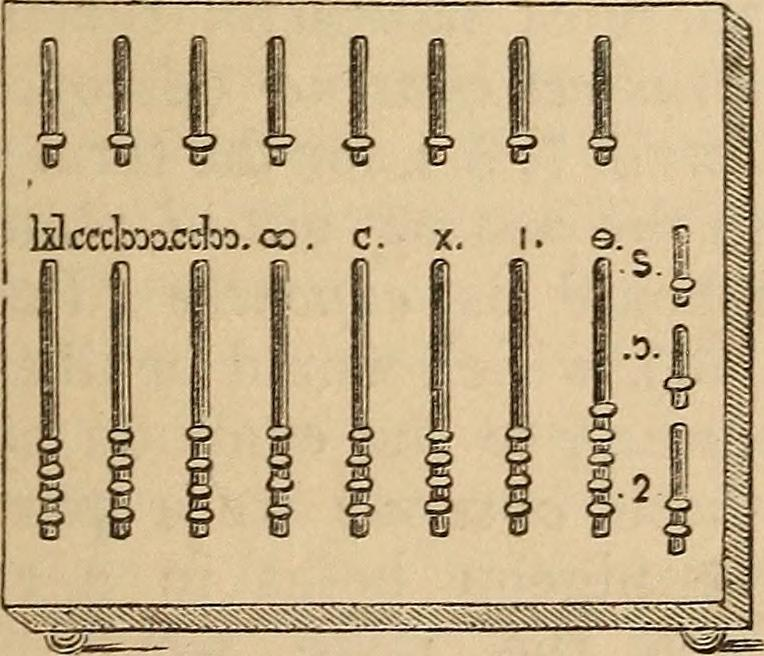
Velser's reconstruction of Roman abacus (ca. 1600)

The Roman hand abacus was one of the earliest known portable calculating devices, used in the Roman world. It was a base-10 form of the abacus, with movable beads held in slots rather than loose counters. The device belonged to a wider Mediterranean tradition of counter-based calculation that included Greek reckoning boards, although its exact developmental lineage is not documented. Its beads represented values in decimal place-value columns, allowing calculations to be carried out on the device, while Roman numerals were used mainly to record results. The device also included positions for fractional values used in Roman measures and Roman currency, especially the uncia, or one-twelfth of a unit.

== Origin ==
The hand-abacus should be distinguished from the larger reckoning board or counting board used with unattached counters. Karl Menninger described Roman land surveys as an example of more complicated calculation for which there was, alongside the hand-abacus, "a true reckoning board with unattached counters or pebbles"; he also noted that Roman counters were called calculi, "little stones". Practical calculation of this kind was needed in many areas of Roman life, including building design, water management, accounting, shops, and land surveying.

Few Roman-period hand-abaci survive. The Aquincum Museum lists examples in Paris, Rome and Aosta, along with two further pieces known from early modern descriptions whose later locations are unknown. The Aosta specimen was found in a cremation grave and dated to the late 1st century AD.

== Layout ==
=== Physical construction ===
The Roman hand-abacus shown here as a reconstruction was made of a metal plate in which beads ran in slots. Its size was such that it could fit in a modern shirt pocket. The beads are believed to have been slid up and down the grooves to indicate the value of each column.

| |    | |    | |    | |    | |    | |    | |    | |
| |    | |    | |    | |    | |    | |    | |    | |
|O|    |O|    |O|    |O|    |O|    |O|    |O|    |O|

|X|  CCC|ƆƆƆ CC|ƆƆ   C|Ɔ     C      X      I      Ө     | |
---    ---    ---    ---    ---    ---    ---    ---  S |O|
| |    | |    | |    | |    | |    | |    | |    | |
| |    | |    | |    | |    | |    | |    | |    | |    | |
|O|    |O|    |O|    |O|    |O|    |O|    |O|    |O|  Ɔ |O|
|O|    |O|    |O|    |O|    |O|    |O|    |O|    |O|   
|O|    |O|    |O|    |O|    |O|    |O|    |O|    |O|    | |
|O|    |O|    |O|    |O|    |O|    |O|    |O|    |O|  2 |O|
                                                 |O|    |O|

=== Whole-number columns ===
The abacus contains seven columns for whole-number counting, each consisting of a longer lower groove with four beads and a shorter upper groove with a single bead. The columns are marked I for units, X for tens, C for hundreds, and so on up to millions.

In each column, the beads in the lower groove represent single units of that column's value, while the bead in the upper shorter groove represents five units. This arrangement resembles a bi-quinary coded decimal place-value system.

=== Fractional columns ===
The two rightmost columns were used for fractional counting. The column marked Ө was used for counting unciae, or twelfths of a whole unit. The rightmost column represented smaller fractions of the uncia.

The longer slot below the Ө position contained five beads. The rightmost column was either a single slot with four beads or three separate slots with one, one, and two beads respectively from top to bottom. In either form, three symbols were included beside the slot or slots; their identification varies among examples and sources, including Friedlein, Menninger, and Ifrah. These fractional positions allowed the device to handle both decimal whole numbers and duodecimal fractions.

== Use with Roman measures and currency ==
The fractional columns made the Roman hand-abacus useful in Roman systems that divided a unit into twelfths. The column marked Ө counted unciae, or twelfths of the unit being reckoned, rather than a single fixed physical unit. From Latin uncia derive the English words inch and ounce.

Roman metrology used twelfths in several contexts. In weight, the libra was divided into 12 unciae; a common later value for the libra is about 0.329 kg, making the weight uncia about 27.4 g. In length, the pes was divided into 12 unciae; on the commonly accepted value of the Roman foot as about 296 mm, a length uncia was about 24.7 mm. In capacity, the congius was divided into six sextarii, or twelve heminae.

The same duodecimal terminology was used in early Roman bronze coinage. In the early aes grave system, the as was a bronze unit marked in values from the as down to its twelfth, the uncia.

== Fractional symbols and interpretations ==
=== Symbol identification ===
The rightmost column of the Roman hand abacus is arranged either as a single slot bearing three symbols or as three separate slots. From top to bottom, these contain one, one, and two beads (or counters) respectively, each marked with a distinct symbol.

The symbols correspond to Roman fractional denominations of the uncia:

- The upper symbol is Σ, Є, Ɛ, 3, 𐆒 or S. This matches the notation for the semuncia (1/2 uncia = 1/24 as).
- The middle symbol is Ↄ, a tall curved stroke open to the left, resembling a closing parenthesis or reversed C. This is the sicilicus (1/4 uncia = 1/48 as), named for its sickle (sicilis) shape.
- The lower symbol often resembles an Arabic digit "2". A similar sign is used for the dimidia sextula (𐆔, 1/12 uncia = 1/144 as) — a reversed S bisected by a horizontal stroke. Other published readings of this lower symbol are discussed below.

Both the semuncia and sicilicus symbols appear on surviving bronze abaci in multiple museums.

=== Sub-uncia fractions ===
Under the twelfths interpretation, the three rightmost sub-uncia positions represented one bead worth 1/2 uncia, one bead worth 1/4 uncia, and two beads each worth 1/12 uncia. On this reading, the three positions can represent any value from 0/12 to 11/12 of an uncia in increments of 1/12:

Twelfths of uncia	1/2 bead	1/4 bead	1/12 beads
0/12	0	0	0
1/12	0	0	1
2/12	0	0	2
3/12	0	1	0
4/12	0	1	1
5/12	0	1	2
6/12	1	0	0
7/12	1	0	1
8/12	1	0	2
9/12	1	1	0
10/12	1	1	1
11/12	1	1	2

This arrangement has twelve possible settings and gives complete, gap-free coverage of all sub-uncia twelfths.

=== Alternative interpretations ===
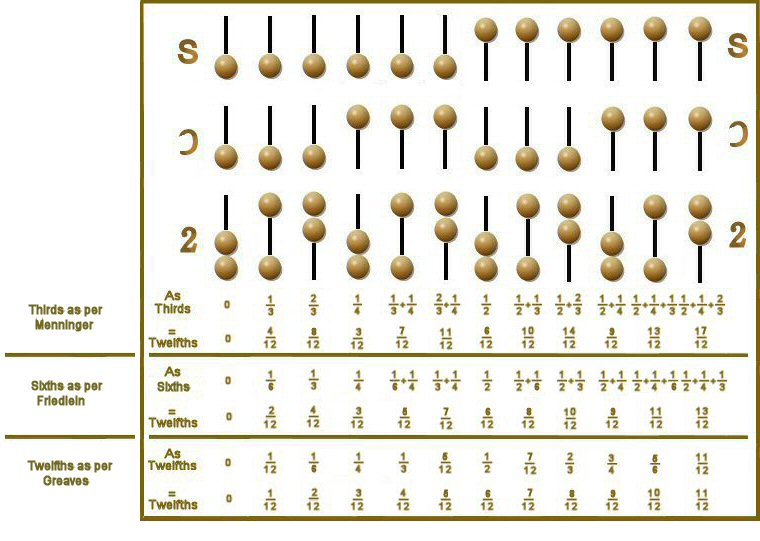
Representable fractions of an uncia under each interpretation

The value of each bead in the two-bead lower slot is inferred from the symbol and from the arithmetic implied by the bead arrangement, and has been interpreted differently by various authors:

Interpretation	Per-bead value	Slot total (2 beads)	Symbol read as	Source
Twelfths	1/12 uncia (1/144 as)	1/6 uncia (1/72 as)	dimidia sextula	Flegg
Sixths	1/6 uncia (1/72 as)	1/3 uncia (1/36 as)	sextula	Friedlein
Thirds	1/3 uncia (1/36 as)	2/3 uncia (1/18 as)	duella	Ifrah; Menninger

Friedlein identifies the lower symbol as a sextula (1/72 as) and states in section 32 (page 23) that each bead has this value. Flegg's table of Roman fractions shows considerable variation in the forms of sub-uncia fraction symbols; among the variants for dimidia sextula, one resembles the lower character found on the abacus.

The twelfths interpretation is compatible with two distinct readings of the symbol:

- The symbol is a sextula sign denoting the slot's total value (1/72 as = two beads × 1/144), rather than the per-bead value. This would contrast with the integer and uncia columns, where symbols denote the unit value of each bead.
- The symbol is not a sextula but a distinct dimidia sextula sign denoting the per-bead value (1/144 as), as suggested by Flegg's identification.

Under either reading, the upper two symbols (semuncia and sicilicus) remain unambiguous, since their slots each contain only one bead.

Mathematically, only the twelfths interpretation gives complete, gap-free coverage of the sub-uncia twelfths. The sixths interpretation cannot represent 1/12 of an uncia and produces an extraneous value of 13/12. The thirds interpretation cannot represent 1/12, 2/12, or 5/12 of an uncia, while allowing values exceeding one full uncia (13/12, 14/12, 17/12).

=== Variations among specimens ===
Minor differences exist between surviving abaci: in at least one example, the fractional and uncia columns are transposed. The reconstruction in the Cabinet des Médailles (Bibliothèque nationale, Paris) and the replica at the Abacus Online Museum both exhibit the three-symbol rightmost column described by Friedlein on page 23.
