= Merenda Kouros =

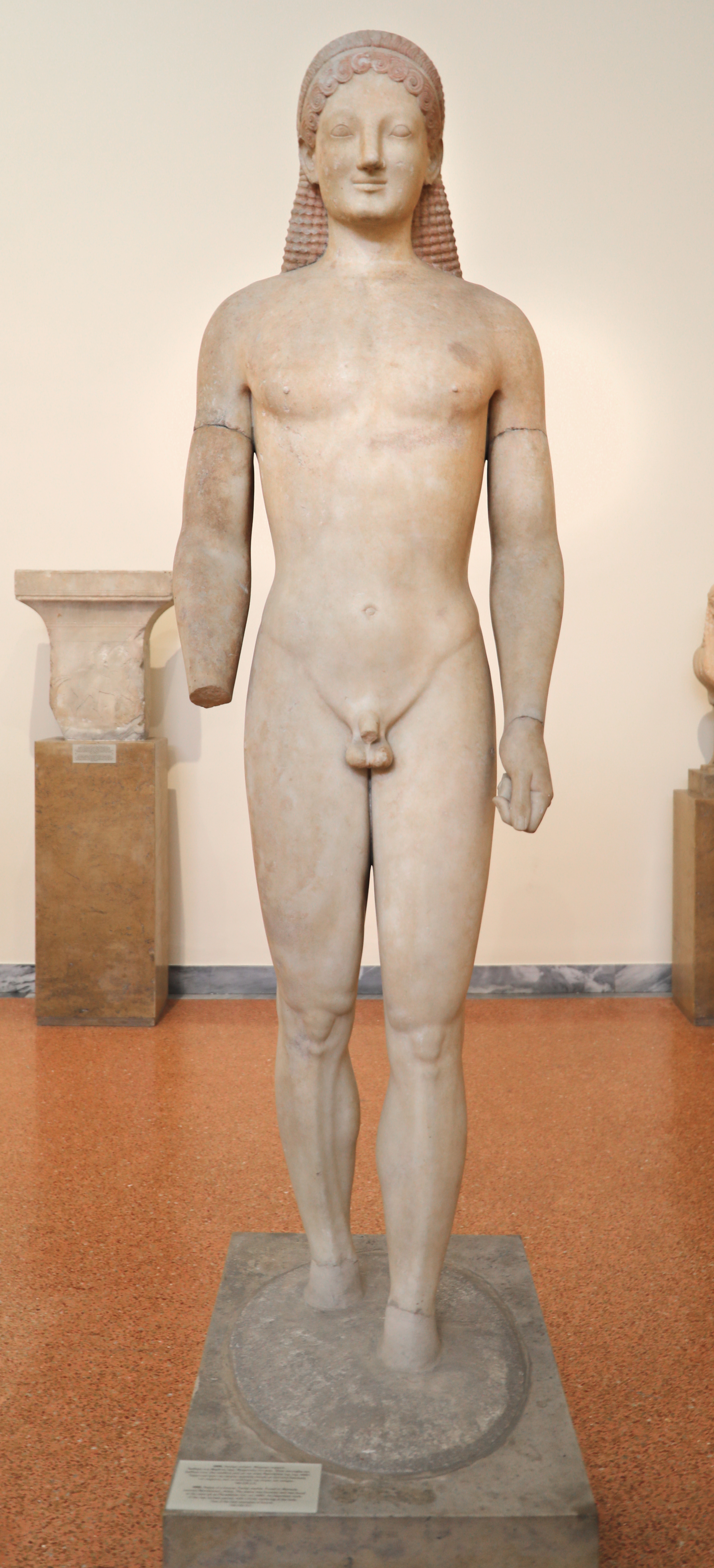
Merenda Kouros on display at the National Archaeological Museum, Athens.

The Merenda Kouros (NAMA 4890) is a Late Archaic Greek Kouros, created approximately 540-530 B.C., measuring 1.89 meters tall and made of Parian marble. As of the present day, it is exhibited in the Sculpture Collection of the National Archaeological Museum, Athens.

== Discovery ==
Extremely well preserved, and maintaining some traces of pigment. It was discovered alongside the Phrasikleia Kore in present-day Merenda, Greece in 1972, 25 miles Southeast of Athens. The area was once a part of the necropolis of the Attic Deme of Myrrhinus. The kore and Phrasikleia laid in situ in a customized shallow pit facing each other, 11 inches from the surface, with a ring of poured lead between the feet of the statues.

How these two statues were buried is still under speculation. One theory is that the statues were buried before the Greco-Persian Wars in order to prevent desecration, though they were found in much better shape than the Perserschutt.

Scholars also speculate that the statues are that of brother and sister, carved by Aristion of Paros, whose name was found on the base of Phrasikleia discovered two centuries earlier in 1729-1730. They were likely members of the Alcmaeonid family, who experienced exile and desecration by caused by the tyrant Pisistratus.

== Description ==
The hair of the kouros is arranged with shell-like curls at the forehead and hangs down the back, with a diadem. The eyes are done in an "early" style. His right hand maintaining a natural fist with staggered fingers but his left hand and both of his feet remain missing. Also noted is that the red pigment remains preserved, specifically around the hair, eyebrows, and nipples.
