= Sacrificial calendar of Athens =

Ancient Greek religious document

The sacrificial calendar of Athens is an Ancient Greek religious document inscribed on stone as part of the Athenian law revisions from 410/9–405/4 and 403/2–400/399 BC. It provides a detailed record of sacrificial practices, listing festivals, types of offerings (both animal and non-animal), and payments to priests and officials. The fragments are preserved in the Agora and Epigraphical Museum in Athens. It was described as "one of the most important documents of ancient Greek religion".

== See also ==
- Ancient Greek calendars
