= Phrasikleia Kore =

Sculpture by Aristion of Paros

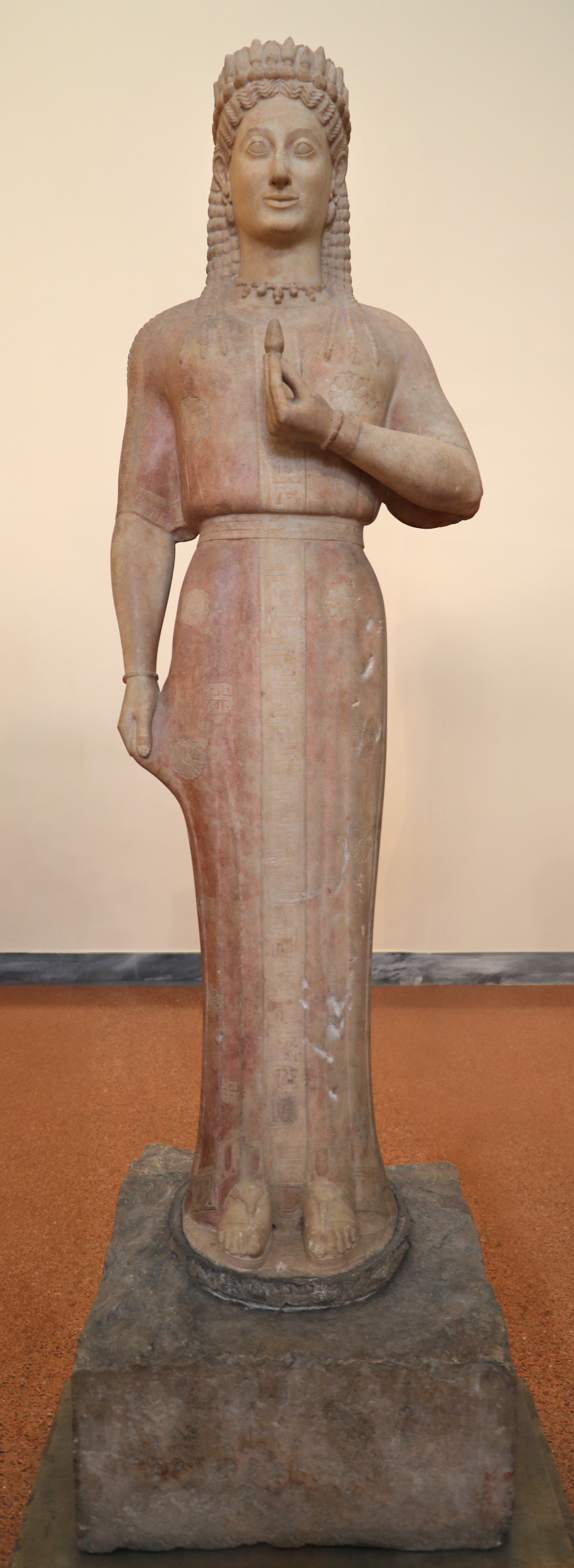
- Artist: Aristion of Paros
- Year: Between 550 and 540 BC
- Location: National Archaeological Museum of Athens

The Phrasikleia Kore is an Archaic Greek funerary statue by the artist Aristion of Paros, created between 550 and 540 BCE. It was found carefully buried in the ancient city of Myrrhinous (modern Merenta) in Attica and excavated in 1972. The exceptional preservation of the statue and the intact nature of the polychromy elements makes the Phrasikleia Kore one of the most important works of Archaic art.

== History ==
The Phrasikleia and the Attic korai are the most well-preserved statues in existence from the 6th century BCE. They represent a type of Archaic female statue intended specifically for funerary use. The Phrasikleia Kore is a Parian marble statue that features prominent polychromy as seen in the hair and the dress. It is thought that the skin of the Phrasikleia Kore was covered with a type of gum arabic to give it a realistic appearance. This practice is also seen during the same period, used on the sarcophagi of Egyptian mummies.

The preservation of the Phrasikleia Kore was so successful because it was buried in a "custom-designed pit." It is thought that the circumstances of the burial of the Phrasikleia Kore was due to the return of the tyrant Peisistratos. As he was consolidating political power over Athens, upon his return to the city, he and his followers sought to expel any family from Athens who disagreed with his authority. Scholars believe that the Alcmaeonid family of Athens was responsible for commissioning the sculpture and for the subsequent burial of the Phrasikleia Kore. The freshness of the statue indicates that this powerful family may have still been grieving the young woman when Peisistratos returned to Athens. This is supported by the distinct absence of mutilation to the Kore. Additionally, the ancient Greek orator Isocrates recorded that the followers of Peisistratos "not only demolished the houses of the Alcmaeonids but they even opened their graves."

== Etymology ==
The name Phrasikleia is derived from the archaic Greek word kléos meaning 'fame'. The word was important to archaic Greek culture, and had significant meaning to the Alcmaeonid family. Evidently, part of an Alcmaeonid family tradition was to bestow given names derived from kléos. This is repeated from generation to generation, including the names Megaklês meaning 'great fame', Kleisthénēs meaning 'fame-strong', and Periklês meaning 'wide fame'.

== Inscriptions ==
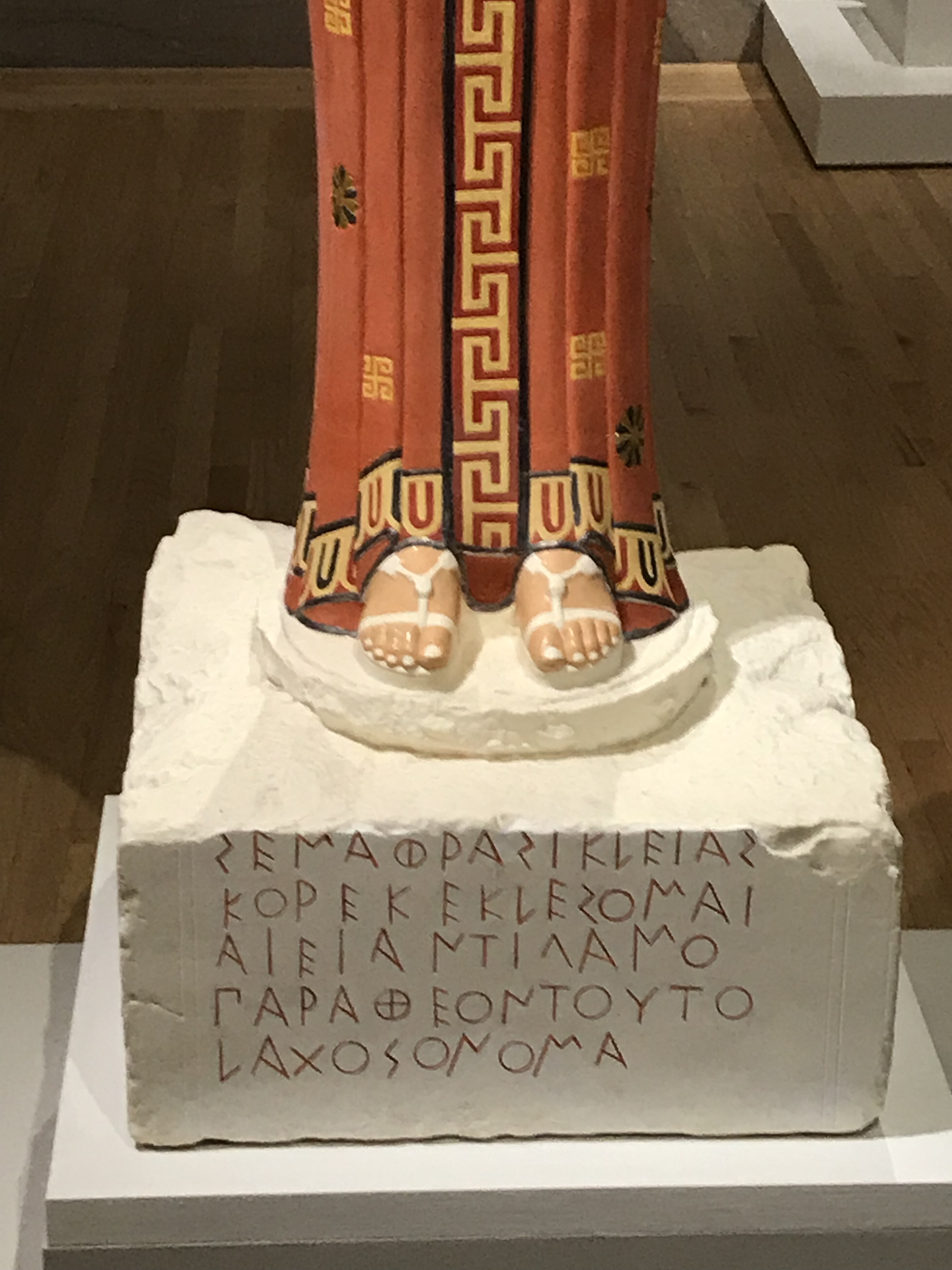
Inscription on the front of the Phrasikleia Kore.

Michel Fourmont, who visited Greece in the years 1729–1730, described a block of marble with an inscription that was found in the church of Panagia (All Saints) of Merenta. The inscription had been rendered illegible before being used in the church, but it was able to be reconstructed.

=== Front inscription ===
Greek
English

ΣΕΜΑΦΡΑΣΙΚΛΕΙΑΣ
ΚΟΡΕΚΕΚΛΕΣΟΜΑΙ
ΑΙΕΙΑΝΤΙΓΑΜΟ
ΠΑΡΑΘΕΟΝΤΟΥΤΟ
ΛΑΧΟΣΟΝΟΜΑ

Σῆμα Φρασικλείας.
Κόρη κεκλήσομαι
αἰεί, ἀντὶ γάμου
παρὰ θεῶν τοῦτο
λάχουσ' ὄνομα.

Tomb of Phrasikleia.
Kore (maiden) I must be called
evermore; instead of marriage,
by the Gods this
name became my fate

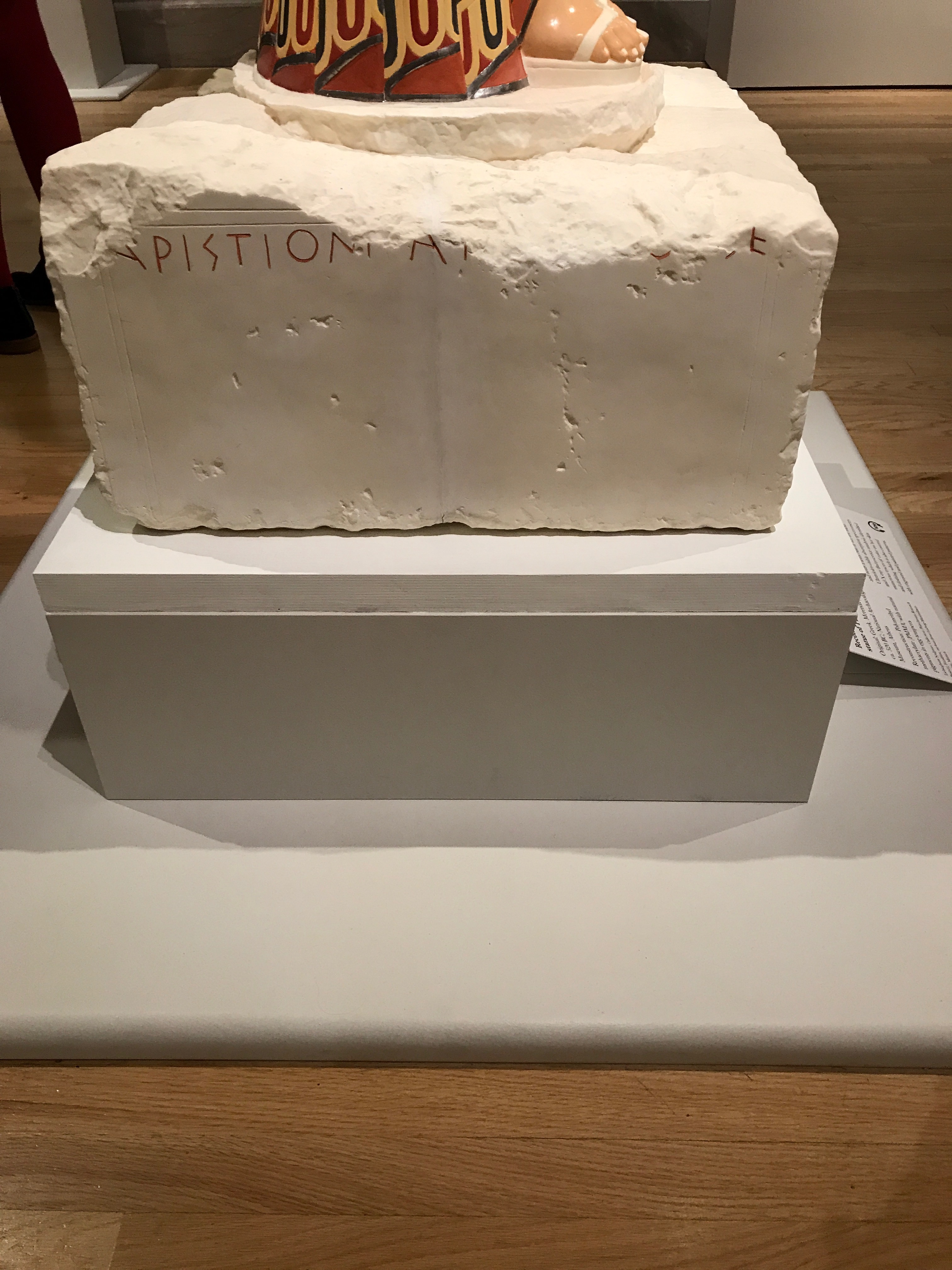
Ariston of Paros inscription on the Phrasikleia Kore (Left side).

=== Left side inscription ===
Greek		English
ΑΡΙΣΤΙΟΝΠΑΡΙ[ΟΣΜΕΠ]Ο[ΙΕ]ΣΕ	Ἀριστίων Πάρι[ος μ' ἐπ]ο[ίη]σε	Aristion of Paros made me

In 1968, the block was removed and placed in the Epigraphical Museum of Athens. By 1972, the archaeologist Efthymios Mastrokostas discovered two marble statues in the tombs at Myrrhinous, a kouros and the Phrasikleia Kore. The two sculptures matched the inscription found on the blocks, discovered at the church of Panagia, located just 200 meters (660 ft) from where the statues were excavated.

In the lower part of the statues an irregular ring of lead was discovered; based on this mass of lead a comparison was made between the statues and the block of marble. The comparison found that the lead ring fit perfectly onto the marble base securing the plinth of the kore, confirming the connection between the two. The Phrasikleia Kore and base were reunited after 25 years, and also confirmed that the statue had been made by the artist Aristion of Paros. Before this reunion, Aristion of Paros had been known from a number of inscriptions, however a singular work had never been officially associated with him. The epigram found on the marble base that identified Ariston may be the earliest extant Attic example of a stoichedon inscription, a style of text where letters are evenly spaced and aligned vertically as well as horizontally.

The statue is now in the National Archaeological Museum of Athens and is displayed in Room 11, catalog number 4889.

== Description ==
The statue is made of Parian marble, and stands 179 centimeters (6.92 ft) high; it rises on a pedestal that gives a total height of 211 centimeters (7 ft) high. As the inscription suggests, it depicts a young woman who died unmarried and therefore must be known forever as a maiden.

She is standing erect and wearing a long chiton, decorated with flowers and meanders. Around her waist she wears a girdle. The foreparts of her feet and sandals are visible. Her right arm hangs down and firmly holds onto her peplos. Her left arm is bent in front of her body and holds a still-unopened lotus flower. On her head she wears a garland of flowers, round about her neck a necklace, and on each arm a bracelet.

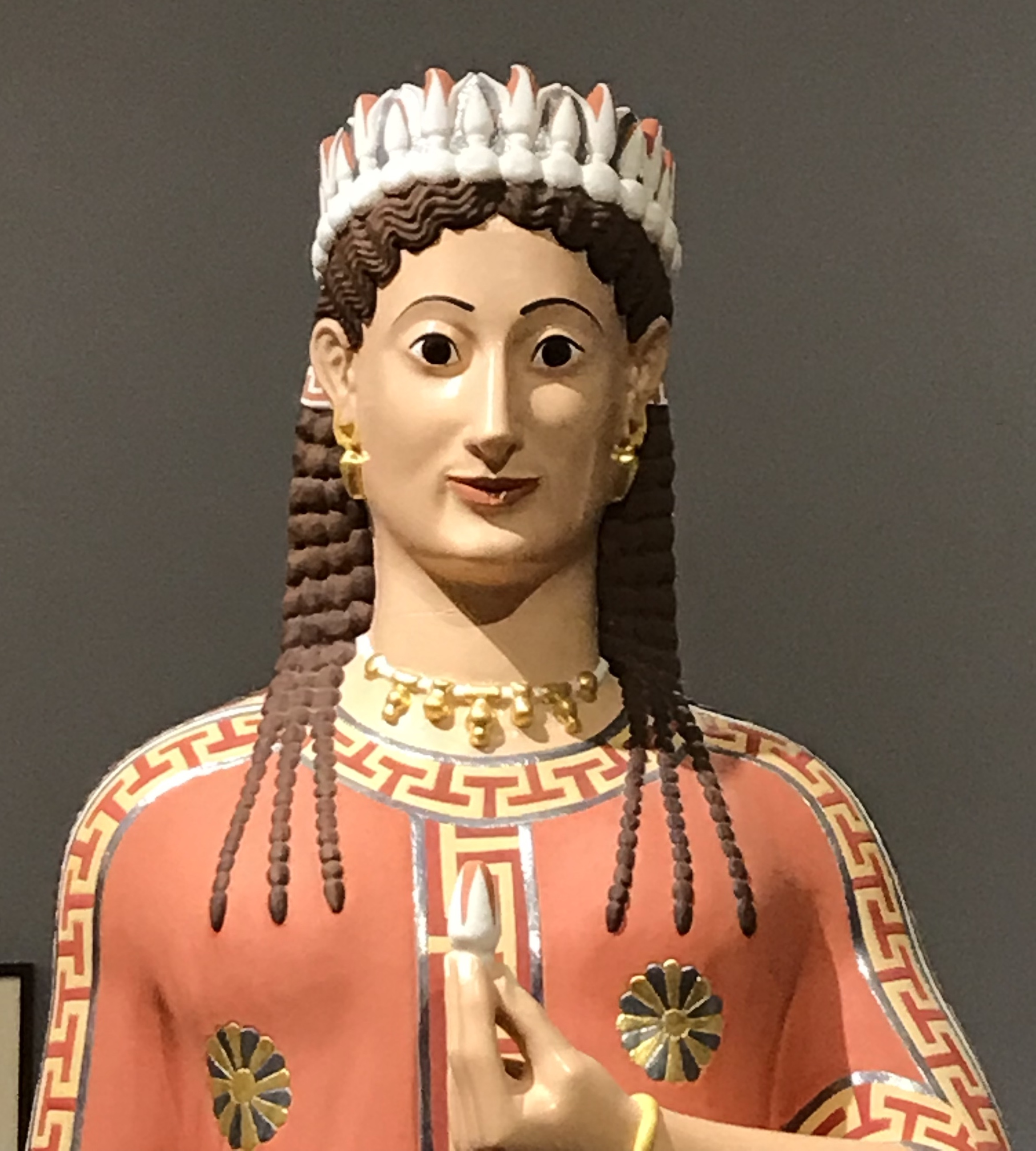
Phrasikleia Kore lotus flower crown.

== Symbolism ==
According to Svenbro, the Phrasikleia Kore may be modeled after the Goddess Hestia. As defined in the Homeric Hymn to Aphrodite, Hestia is explicitly referred to as koúrē, who swears to remain a virgin forever. The hymn claims that Hestia was called upon by Zeus to be honored as a god, rather than to remain on earth to be married. Evidence may be seen when compared to the epigram on the Phrasikleia Kore; "Kore (maiden) I must be called evermore; instead of marriage, by the Gods this name became my fate."

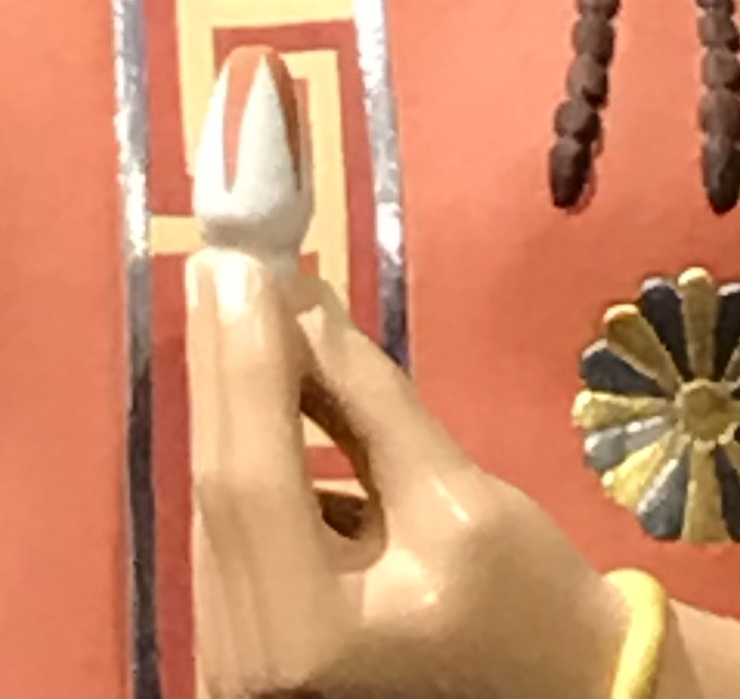
Phrasikleia Kore lotus flower bud (left hand).

The lotus, which is repeated on the crown of the Phrasikleia Kore and held in her left hand, is an Egyptian funerary symbol used by the Greeks. It would have been customary to adorn the dead with a floral crown, like the one seen on the Phrasikleia Kore. The crown of lotuses worn by the statue may carry a double meaning: the round shape, with the spear-like lotus buds that make up the crown, may reference the gates of the underworld. The lotus is not only used on the crown, but also held in the hand of the kore; it is thought to represent Phrasikleia: "plucked before it could bloom," representing her status as a virgin and unmarried woman at the time of her death.

== Function ==
The primary function of the Phrasikleia Kore was as a funerary statue or votive offering. In this case, Phrasikleia marked the grave of a girl who died unmarried. This is confirmed by the inscription on her pedestal, in addition to the symbolism of the jewelry, peplos, and the lotus flower used on the statue.

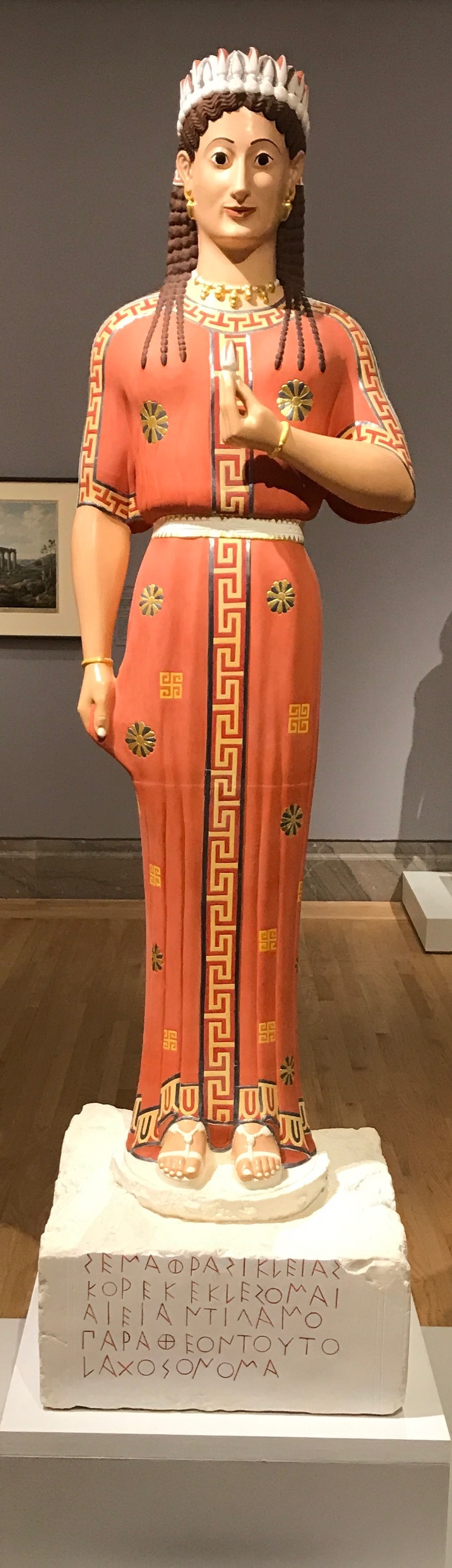
Phrasikleia Kore full polychromy restoration, displayed at Gods in Color exhibition at the Legion of Honor, San Francisco, CA (2017).

== Polychromy ==
One reconstruction of the polychromy on Phrasikleia Kore displays an impressive use of eleven different reds, yellows, black, and white pigments. The color of her skin alone uses a mixture of white lead, red ochre, and light brown umber to achieve a mimetic quality. In addition, the statue is embellished with gold and lead foil appliqués.

A possible recreation of the statue has been made via the Brinkmann reconstruction reflecting the existing visible pigment remaining on the statue and with the assistance of technology such as ultraviolet-visual absorption spectrometry and X-ray fluorescence analysis to detect traces of color, engravings and painted patterns, to recreate what the Phrasikleia Kore might have looked like before her burial in the 6th century BCE, according to one recreation. This recreation of the statue may be seen at the Gods in Color exhibit, which travels to major museums around the world.

== Gallery ==
Various angles and close-up images of the Phrasikleia Kore

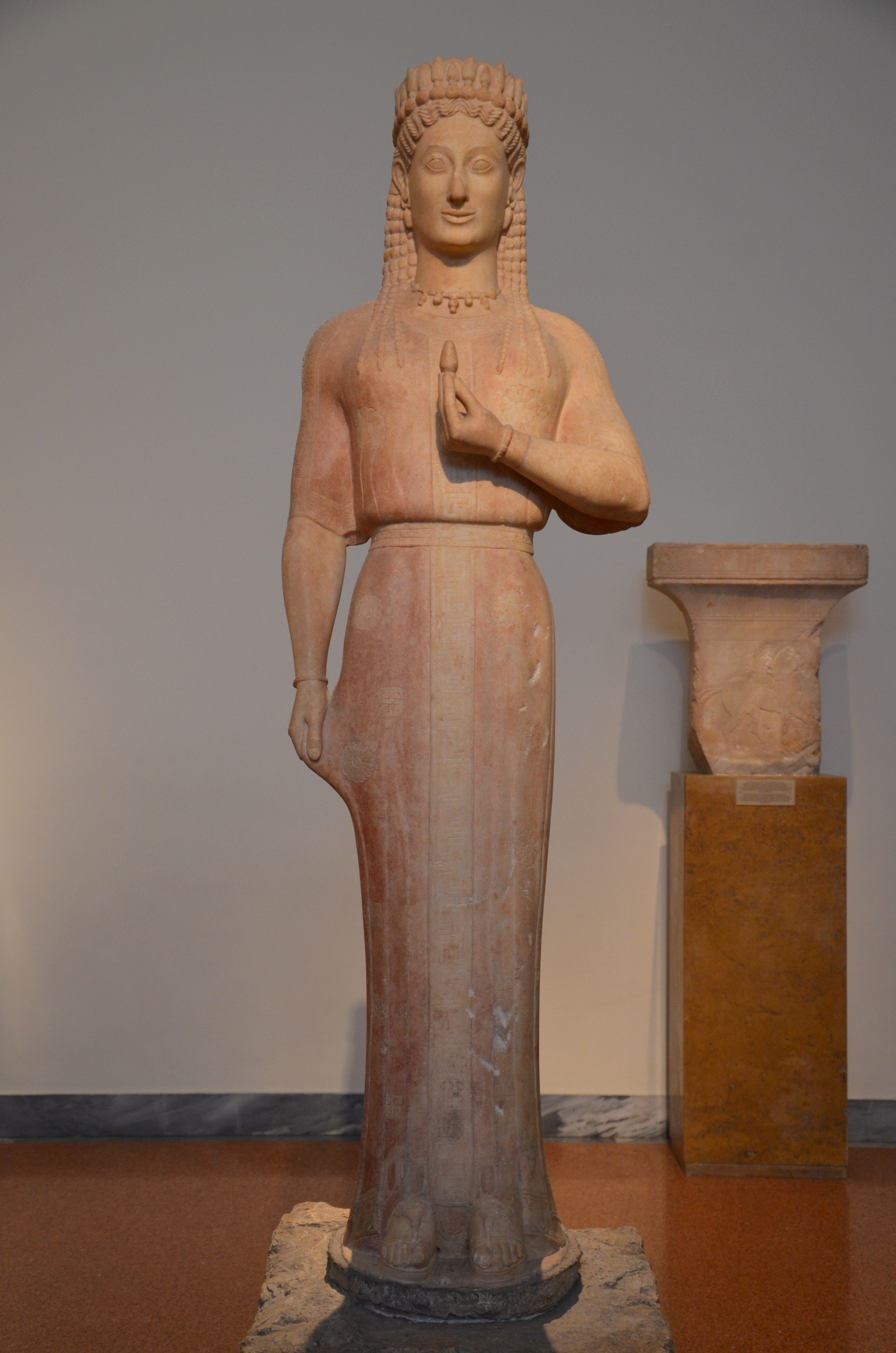

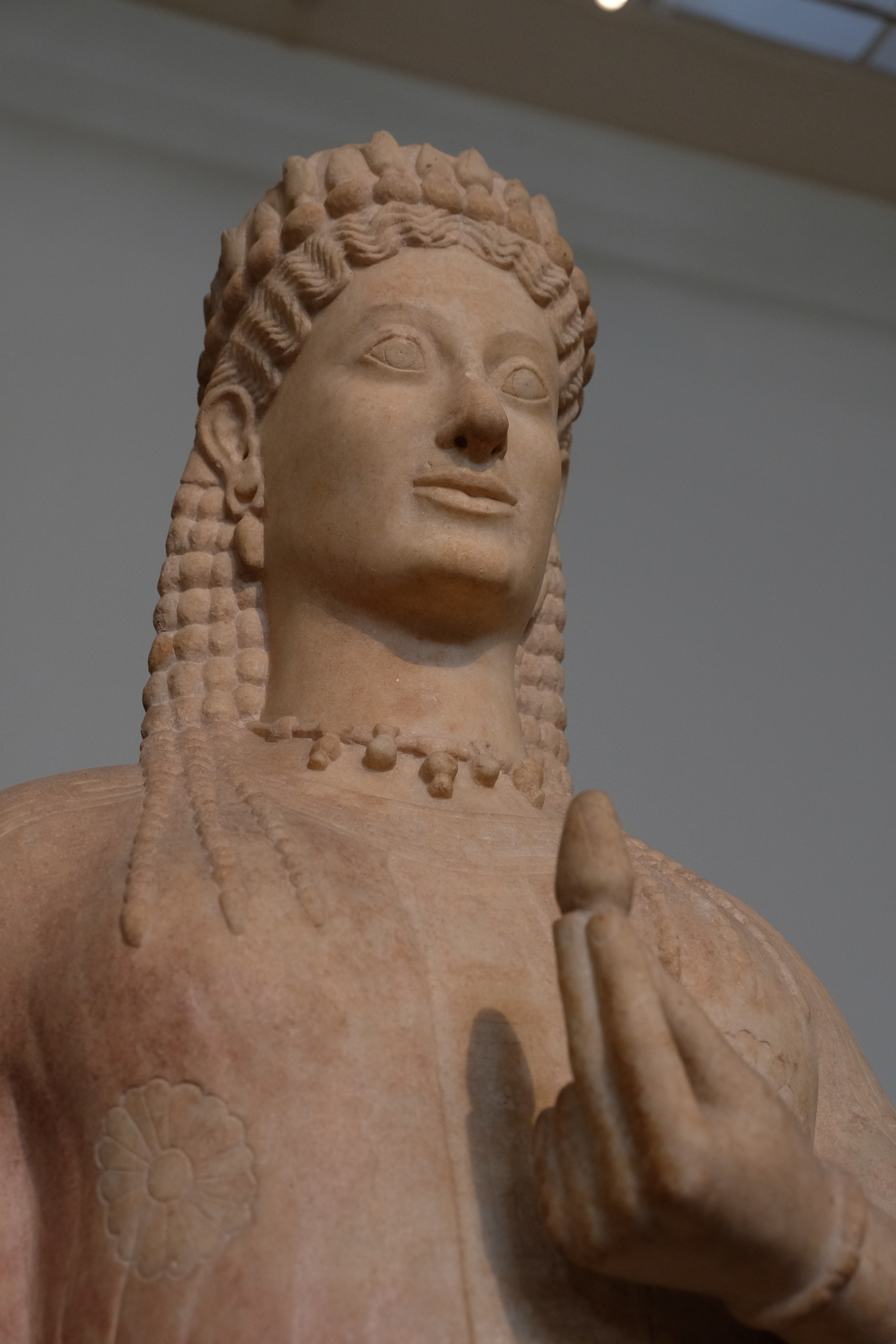

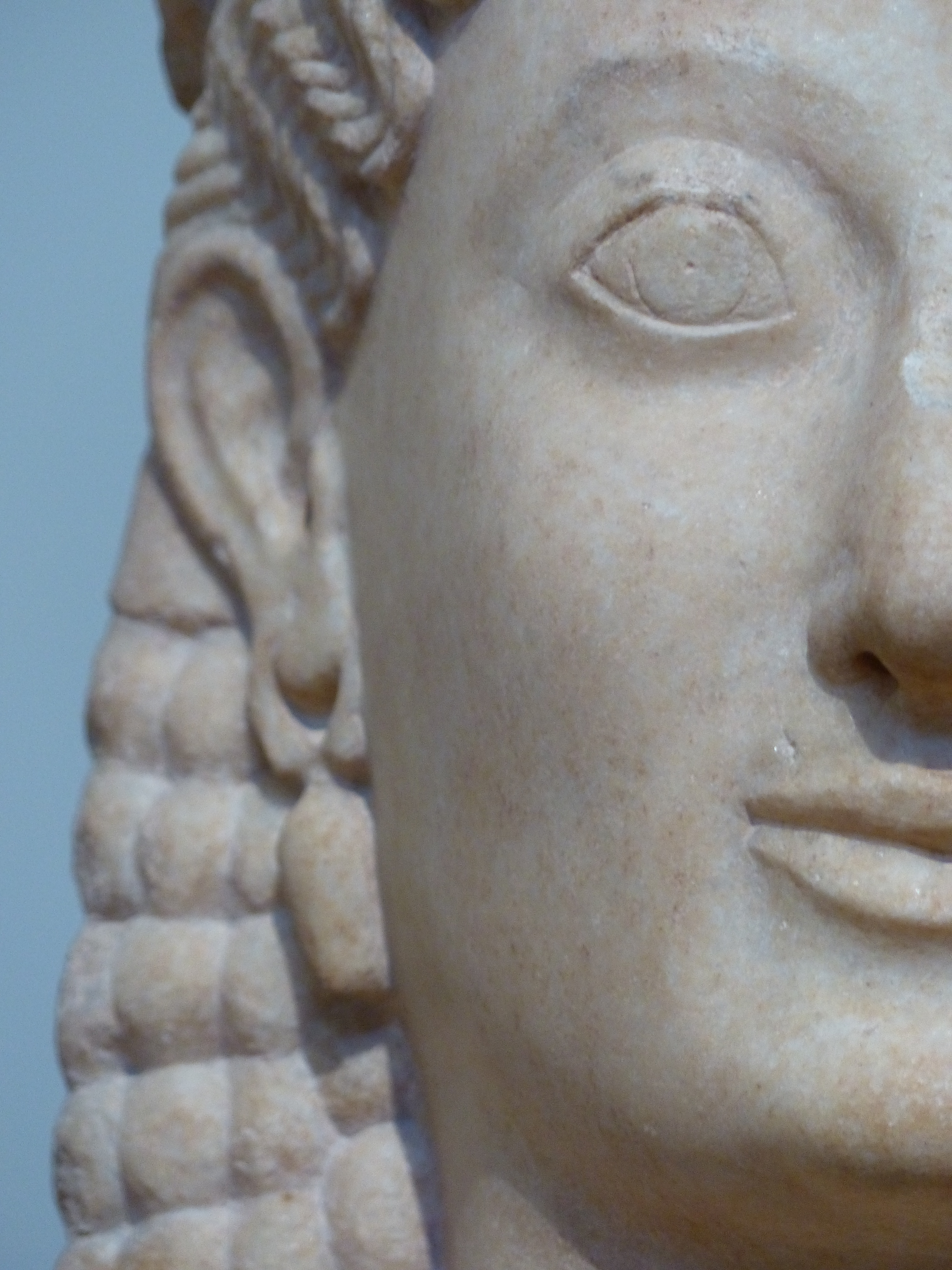

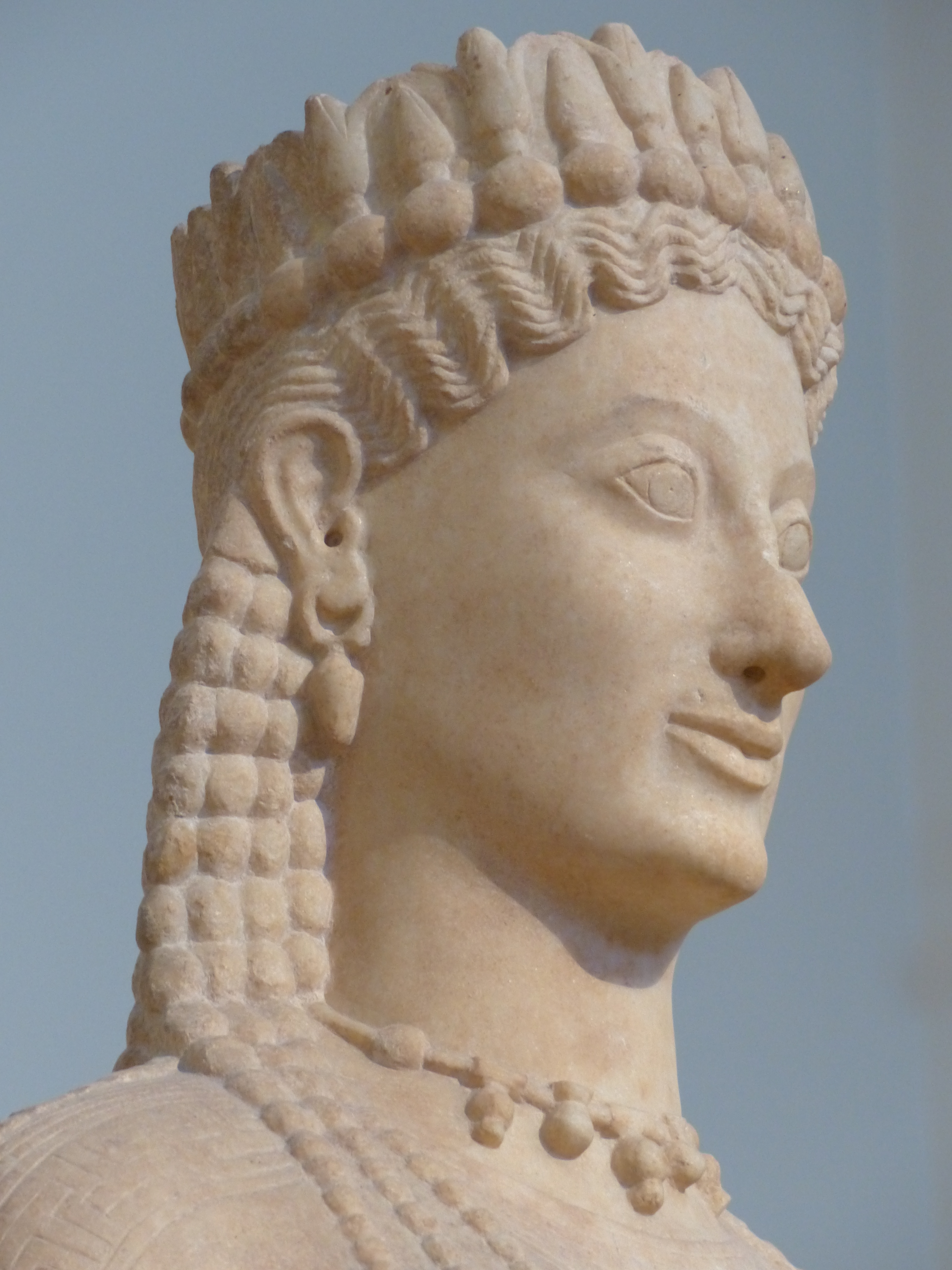

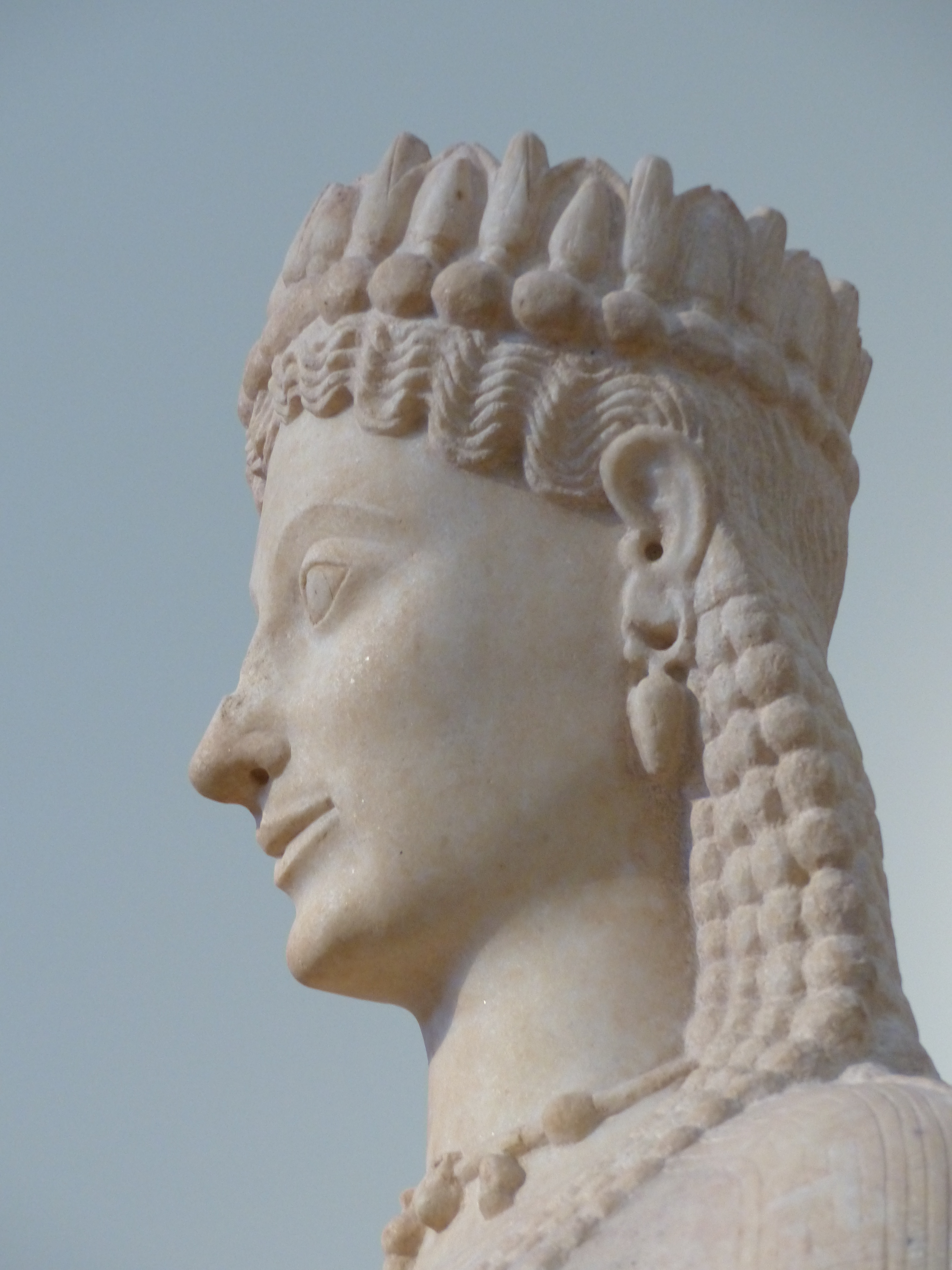

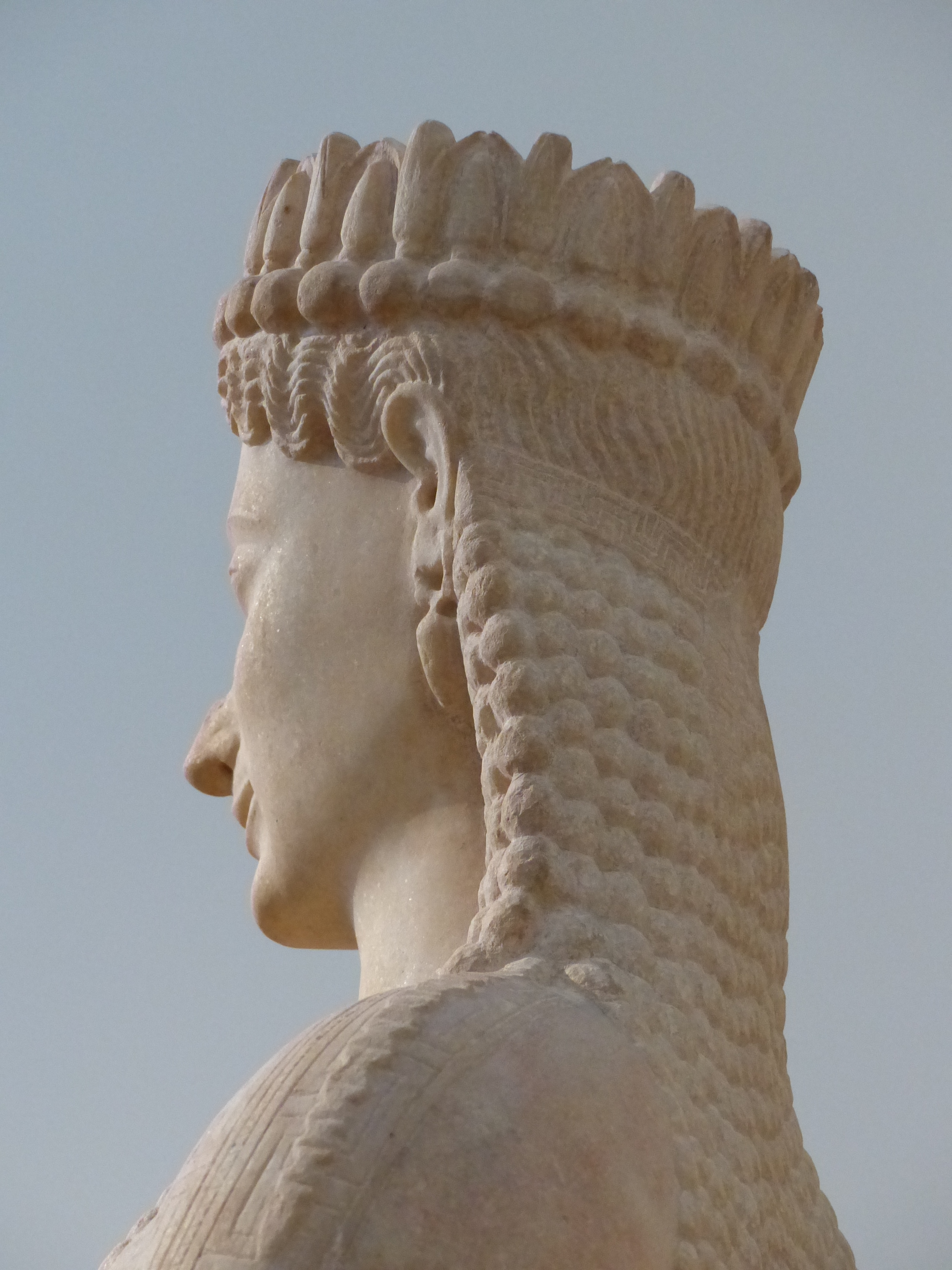

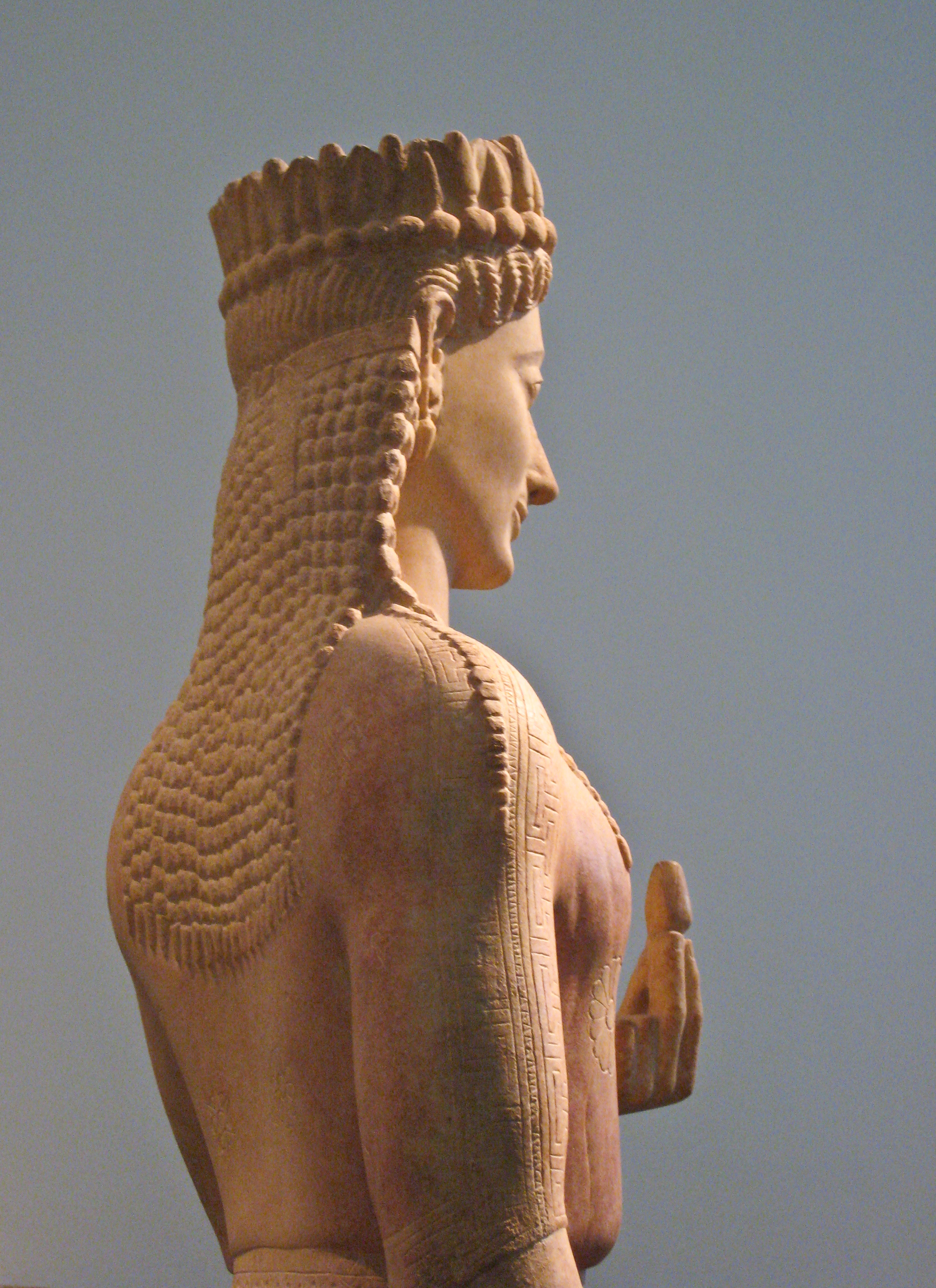

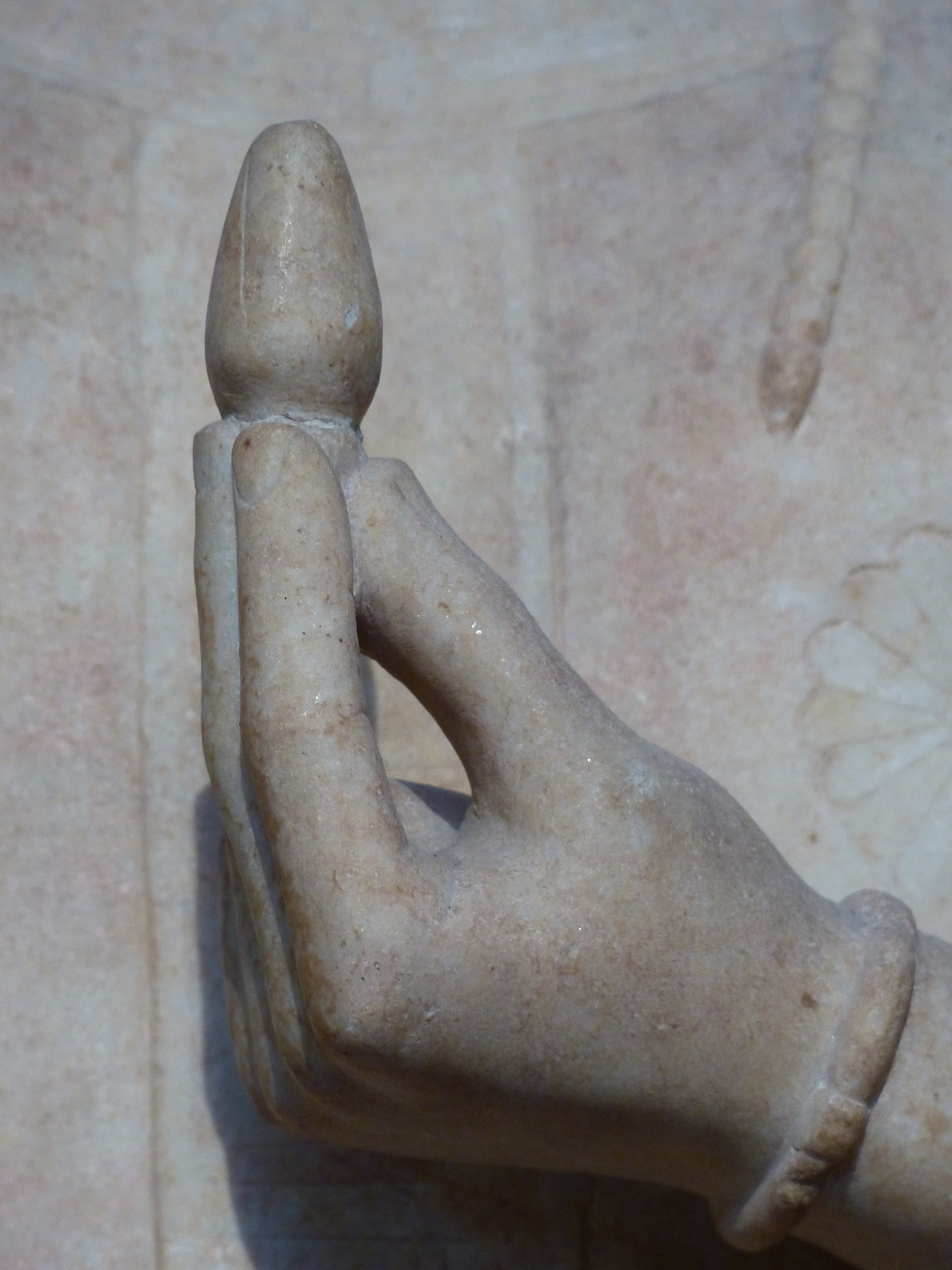

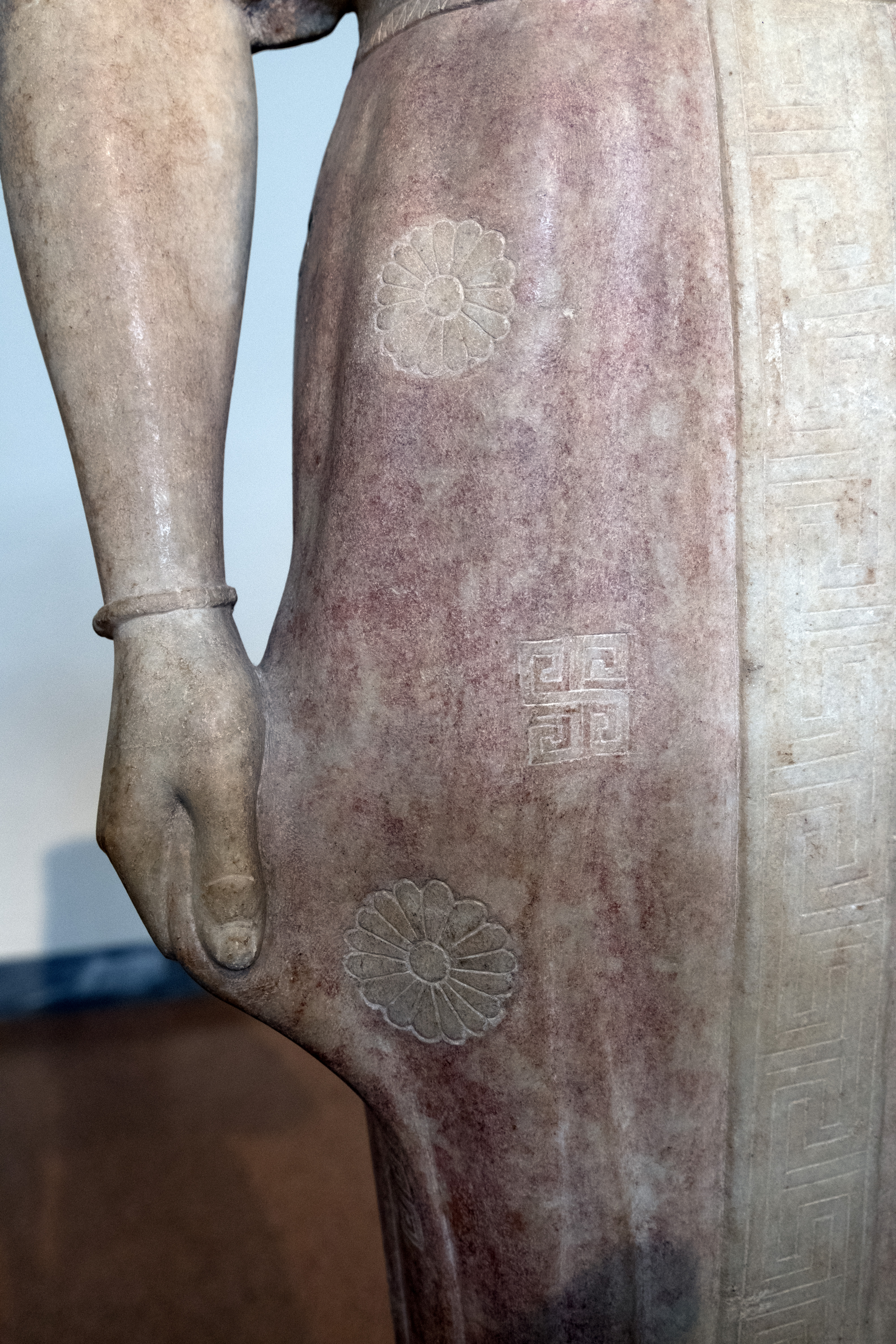

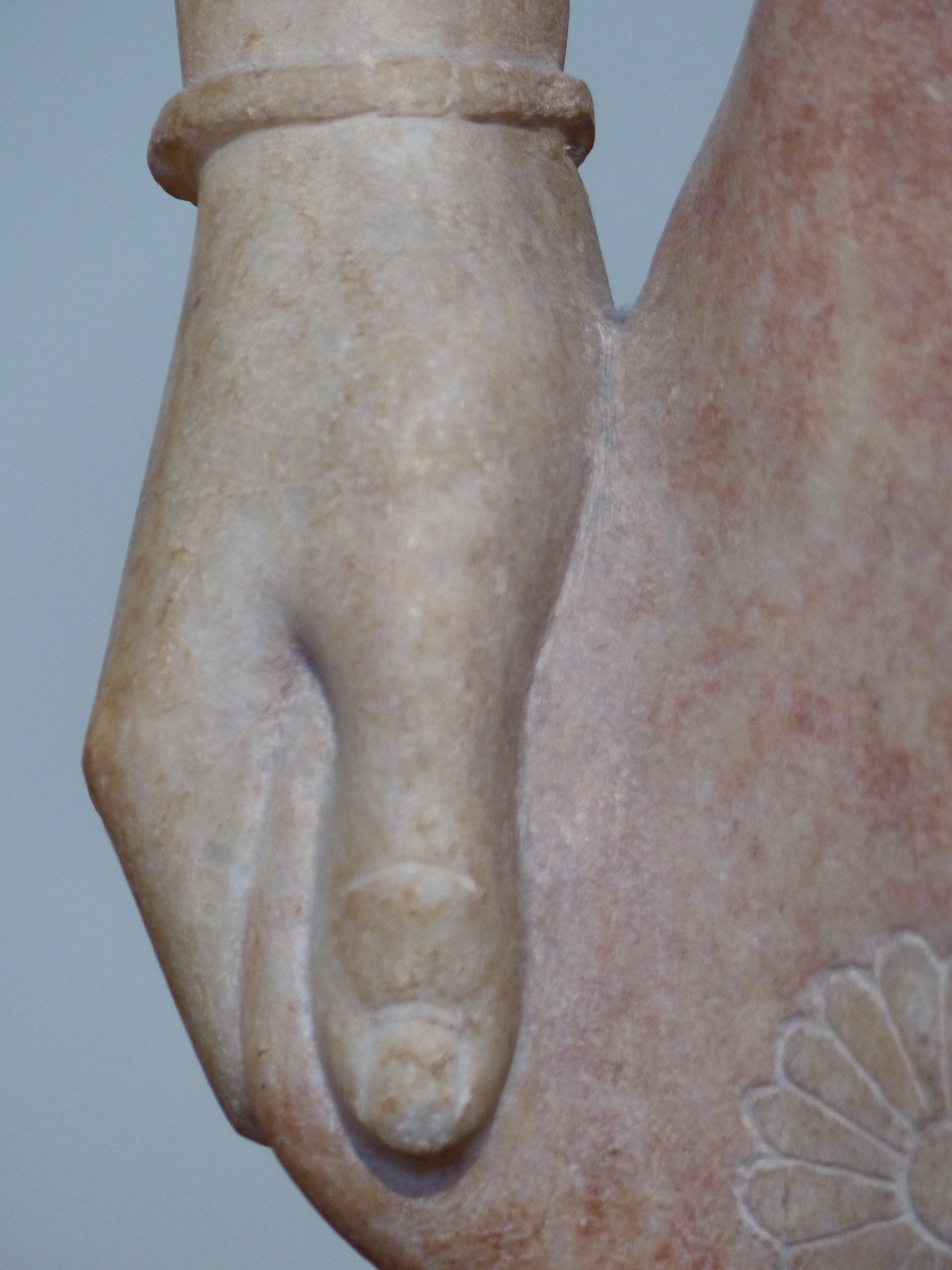

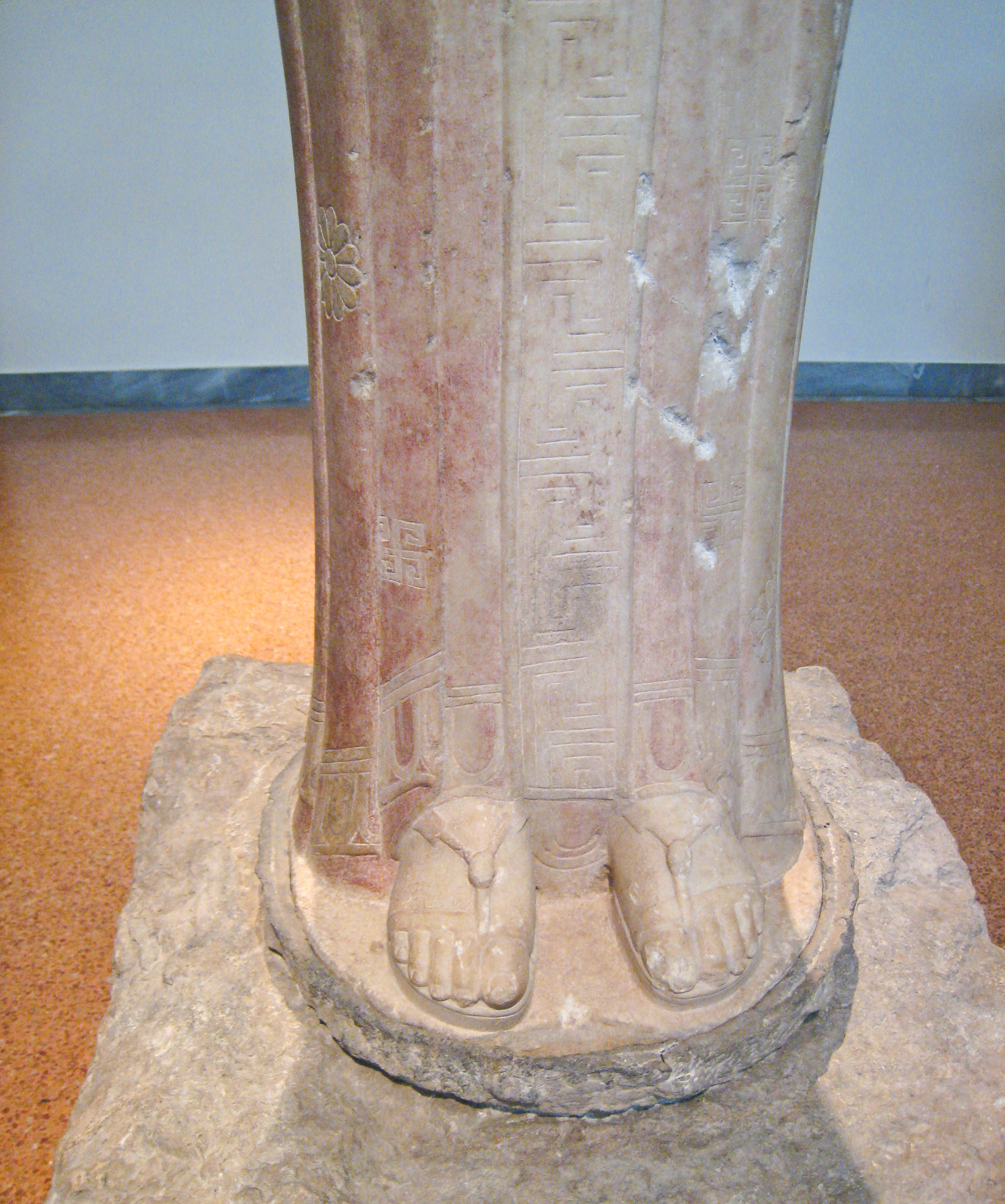

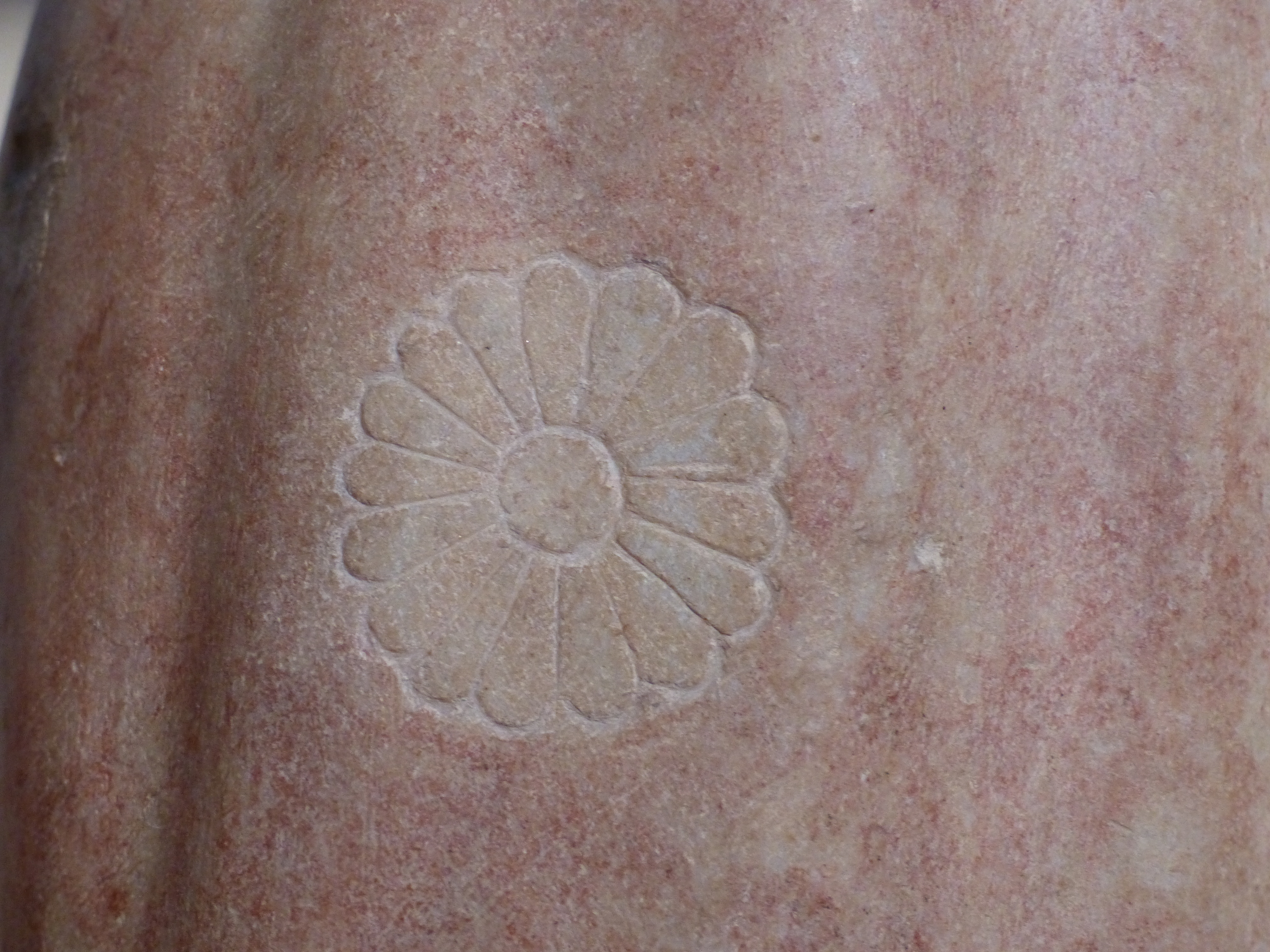

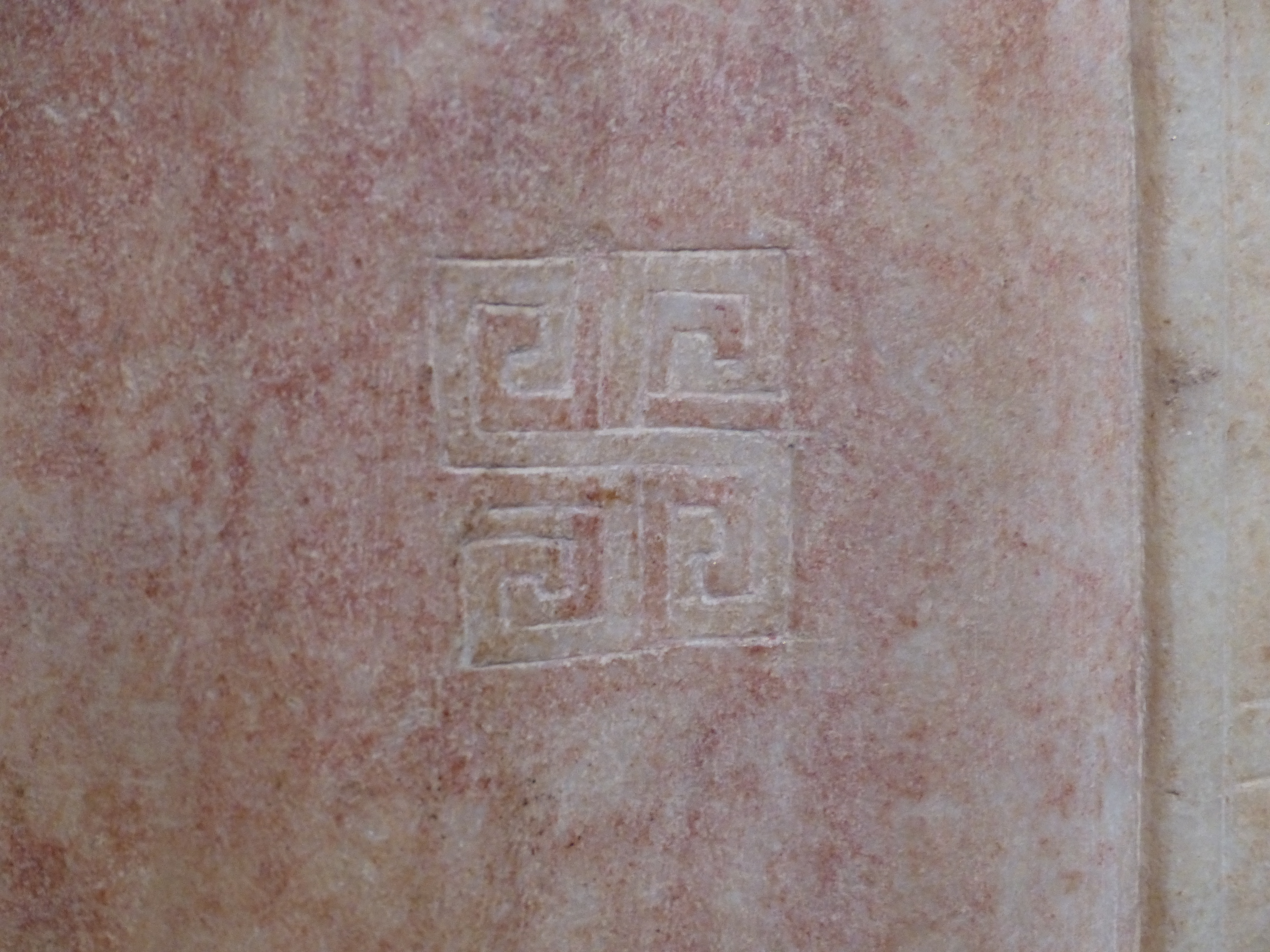

== Bibliography ==
Claridge, Amanda. "Looking for Colour on Greek and Roman Sculpture." Journal of Art Historiography number 5 (2011), 1-6.

Fuchs, Werner; Floren, Josef (1987). Die griechische Plastik: Die geometrische und archaische Plastik. Munich: C.H. Beck, p. 164. ISBN 3406317189. Retrieved January 27, 2014.

Gods in Color, "Reconstruction of the Grave Statue of Phrasikleia, 2010." The Legion of Honor, San Francisco, CA.

Goette, Hans Rupprecht (2001). Athens, Attica, and the Megarid: An Archaeological Guide. London and New York: Routledge. p. 114. ISBN 041524370X.

"Inscriptiones Graecae I³ 1261". Searchable Greek Inscriptions. Retrieved January 27, 2014. From the Inscriptiones Graecae (IG)

Osborne, Robin (1998). Archaic and Classical Greek Art. Oxford and New York: Oxford University Press. p. 84.

Svenbro, Jesper. Phrasikleia: an anthropology of reading in ancient Greece. Cornell University Press, Ithaca 1993, ISBN 0-8014-9752-3 (Extract on Google Books).

Spivey, Nigel. "Art and Archaeology." Greece and Rome 52, no. 1 (2005): 118-20.

Stieber, Mary C. The Poetics of Appearance in the Attic Korai. 1st ed. Austin: University of Texas Press, 2004. pp. 146–147. ISBN 0292701802. Retrieved January 27, 2014.

Vinzenz Brinkmann, Ulrike Koch-Brinkmann, Heinrich Piening. The Funerary Monument to Phrasikleia, in: Circumlitio. The Polychromy of Antique and Mediaeval Sculpture, Akten des Kolloquium Liebieghaus Frankfurt 2008, (Vinzenz Brinkmann, Oliver Primavesi, Max Hollein, eds.), 2010, p. 188-217. (Stiftung Archäologie Electronic Resource).
