= Stoichedon =

Ancient Greek epigraphy style

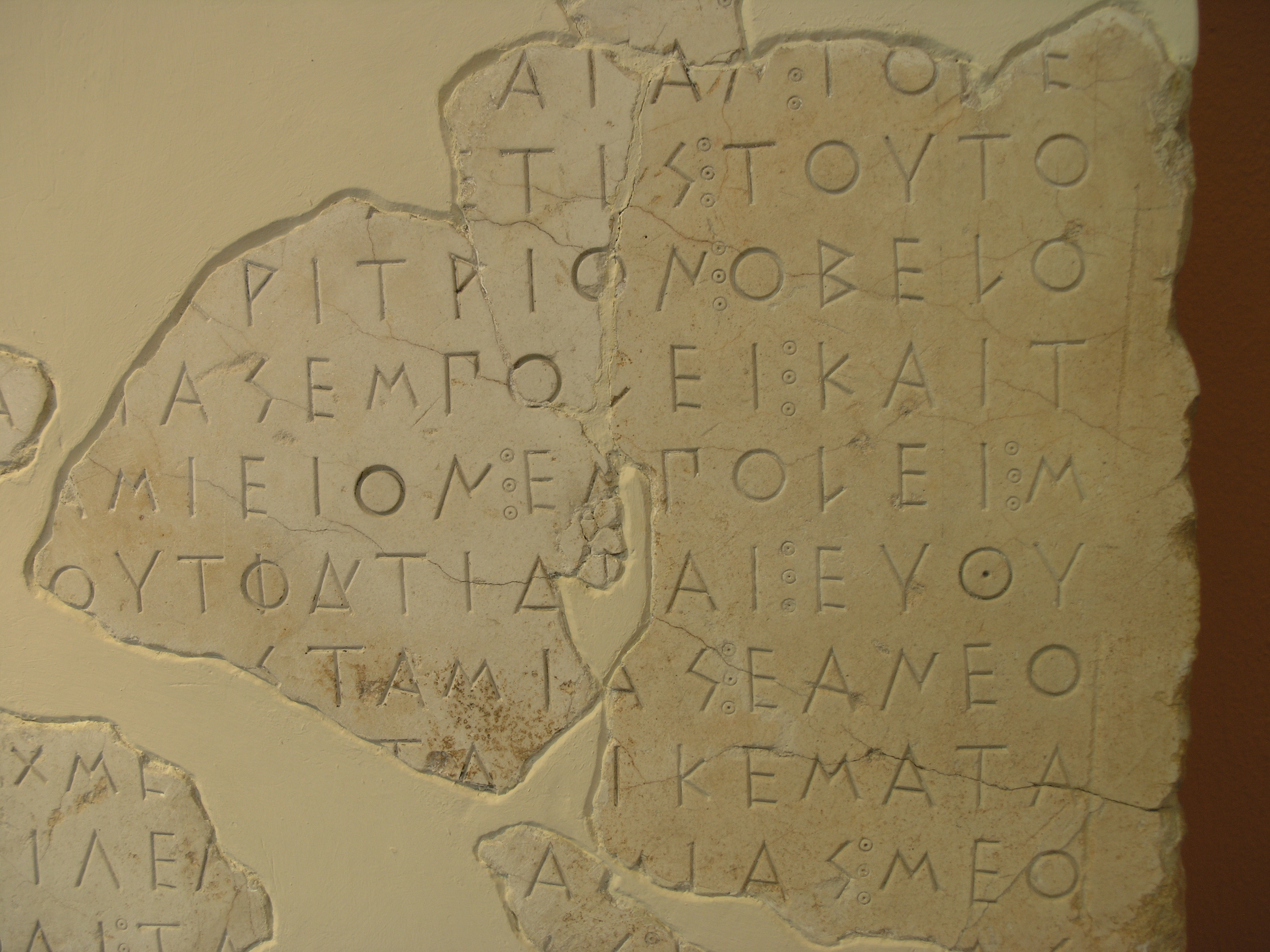
Detail of the Sacred law concerning temple-worship on the Acropolis, EM 6794 (IG I^{3} 4B)

The stoichedon style of epigraphy (from στοιχηδόν, a Greek adverb meaning "in a row") was the practice of engraving ancient Greek inscriptions in capitals in such a way that the letters were aligned vertically as well as horizontally. Texts of this form give the appearance of being composed in a grid with the same number of letters in each line and each space in the grid filled with a single letter; hence, there are no spaces between words, and no spaces or punctuation between sentences. The majority are Attic, but it was widely used in the Greek world, and the earliest examples are from not later than the mid-6th century BCE; the first is perhaps the Phrasikleia Kore or the Salaminian Decree. It was the dominant style of inscription in Athens during the 5th and 4th centuries BCE and was the preferred style for official state proclamations. The last stoichedon text dates from the 3rd century CE and is the genealogical inscription from the Heroon of Oenoanda in Lycia. The idiom was less common in Latin epigraphy; a rare exception is the Sator square.

This form of inscription is of particular interest to scholars of Greek epigraphy due to the chance it affords to reconstruct fragmentary texts. Few, if any, Greek tablets survive intact; however, the language and tenor of inscriptions are often formulaic and with a knowledge of the precise number of missing letters it is possible to make an informed guess about the lost text.

== See also ==
- Boustrophedon
- Monospaced font

== Bibliography ==
- R. P Austin, The Stoichedon Style in Greek Inscriptions, Oxford, 1938.
- M. J. Osborne, ZPE 10, 1973, 249–70.
- R. Thomas, Literacy and Orality in Ancient Greece, CUP, 1992, 88.
- A. G. Woodhead, The Study of Greek Inscriptions, 1967.
- Soichedon Style web-page on Centre for the Study of Ancient Documents, Oxford University
