= Reckoning board =

Counting device

The reckoning board, also called a memory board or hole board, could be used on its own as a basic counting device or used with an abacus for engineering.

There were two types of reckoning board. The older type was a simple 10 × 10 grid of holes. A peg would be inserted into a hole and moved along, starting from the top and working downwards. It was used as a memory aid when counting certain units. For every sack of grain or bar of steel, the peg would be moved forward and after a day or a week, the total number counted could be seen.

The more advanced type had columns of holes, with the columns indicating place value.

== See also ==
- Counting board
- Cribbage board
- Sand table
