= Uncia =

Uncia may refer to:

- Uncia (coin), an ancient Roman bronze coin
- Uncia (length), an ancient Roman unit of length
- An ancient Roman unit of mass roughly equivalent to the ounce
- Uncia (mine), a Bolivian tin mine
- Uncia (genus), the former genus of the snow leopard, a large cat native to the mountain ranges of central Asia
