= Myrrhinus =

Ancient administrative unit of Attica, Greece

Coordinates: 37°52′22″N 23°58′04″E

Myrrhinus or Myrrinous (Ancient Greek: Μυρρινοῦς) was a deme of ancient Attica which belonged to the phyle (clan) of Pandionis. It lay to the east of Prasiae. Artemis Colaenis was worshipped at Myrrhinus; and in one of the inscriptions recovered at Merenda mention is made of a temple of Artemis Colaenis.

The site of Myrrhinus is located near modern Merenda. The recent excavation at the new Equestrian Centre at Merenda, Markopoulo, where the ancient demos of Myrrhinous is located, gives some idea of the aspect of the centre of the aforesaid demoi. Here, in the middle of the flat space lying between the foothills of the homonymous mountain and the low vine-planted hills, a peripteral temple, probably dedicated to Artemis Kolainis, one of the most important in the city, and a sanctuary of Aphrodite have been brought to light at the crossroad of the two central arteries of the 𝘥𝘦𝘮𝘰𝘴, which are lined at intervals by cemeteries, classical tomb enclosures and two sanctuaries. Identified and excavated around the temple, at some distance, were three porticoed buildings of public character, in no particular order, the sanctuary of a phratry, and very close behind it, a monumental fountain that had been reconstructed in Roman times, while farmhouses extended on the small hills around.

== People ==
- Eurymedon of Myrrhinus, brother-in-law of Plato
- Phaedrus (Athenian), aristocrat depicted in the dialogues of Plato
- Speusippus, philosopher and Plato's nephew
- Tettigidaea (Ancient Greek: Τεττιγιδαία) of Myrrhinus, Nicostratus (comic poet) was in love with her, and he jump from the Leucas Rock in order to be cured from the love.
