= Epigraphical Museum =

Coordinates: 37°59′18.8″N 23°43′56.3″E

The Epigraphical Museum of Athens
- Επιγραφικό Μουσείο
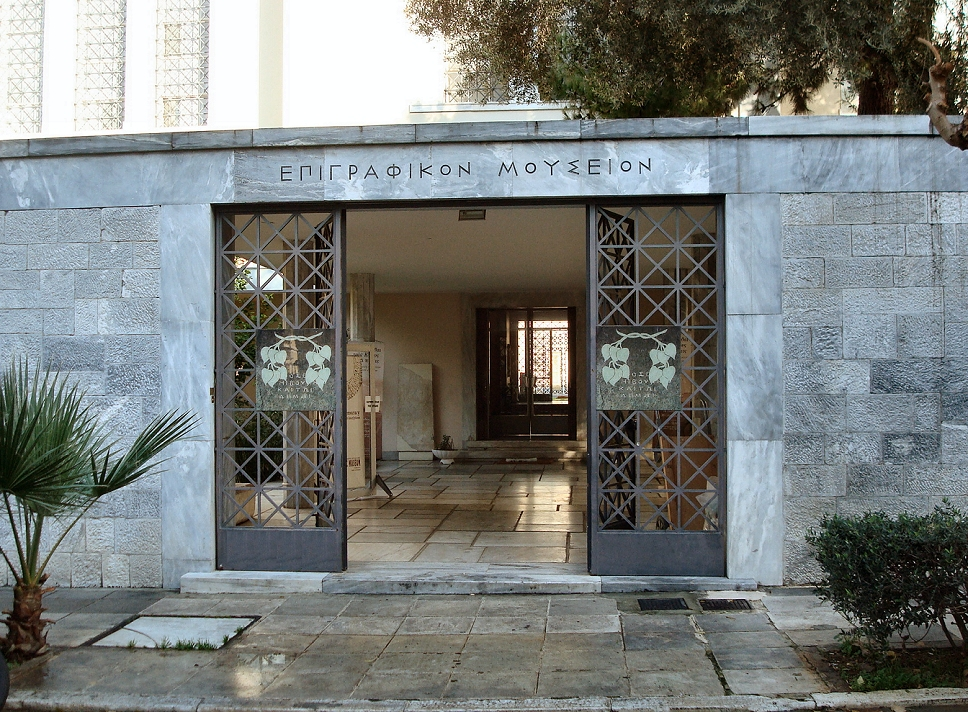
- Established: 1885
- Location: 1 Tositsa Str., Athens, Greece
- Type: Archaeological museum
- Public transit access: Viktoria station Omonoia station

The Epigraphical Museum (Greek: Επιγραφικό Μουσείο) of Athens, Greece, is unique in Greece and the largest of its kind in the world. Its collection comprises 14,078, mostly Greek, inscriptions, which cover the period from early historical times to the Late Roman period, primarily in Greece. It is situated in the south wing of the National Archaeological Museum of Athens. It comprises an internal and external courtyard (atrium), a lobby, eleven rooms, a large hypostyle Pi-shaped corridor, a gallery, offices, a laboratory for the conservation of inscribed stone monuments and lavatories. Only the courtyards, lobby and four rooms are open to the public, while the rest is reserved for researchers. A full photographic archive of the collection is being assembled for future visitors.

== Gallery ==
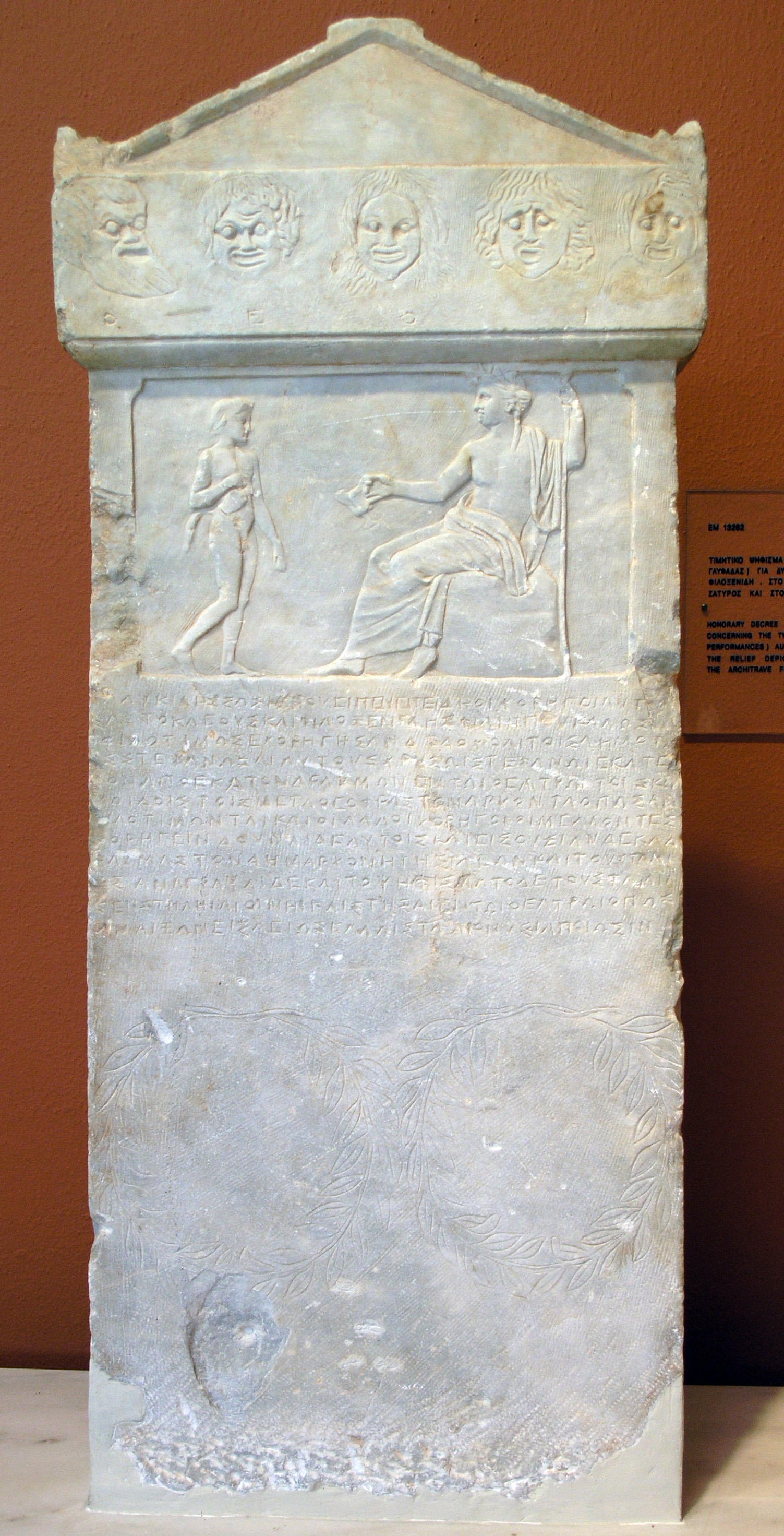

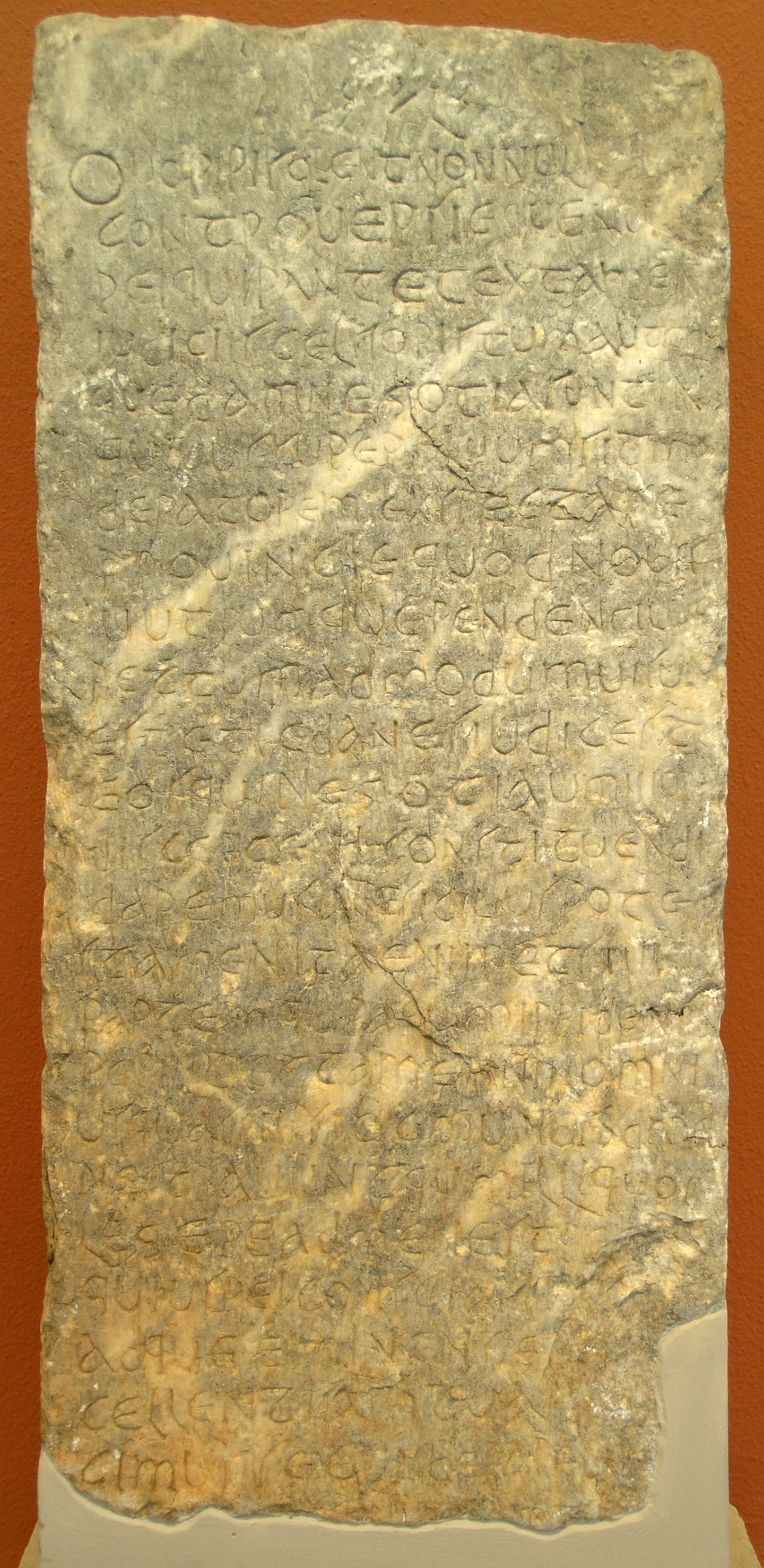

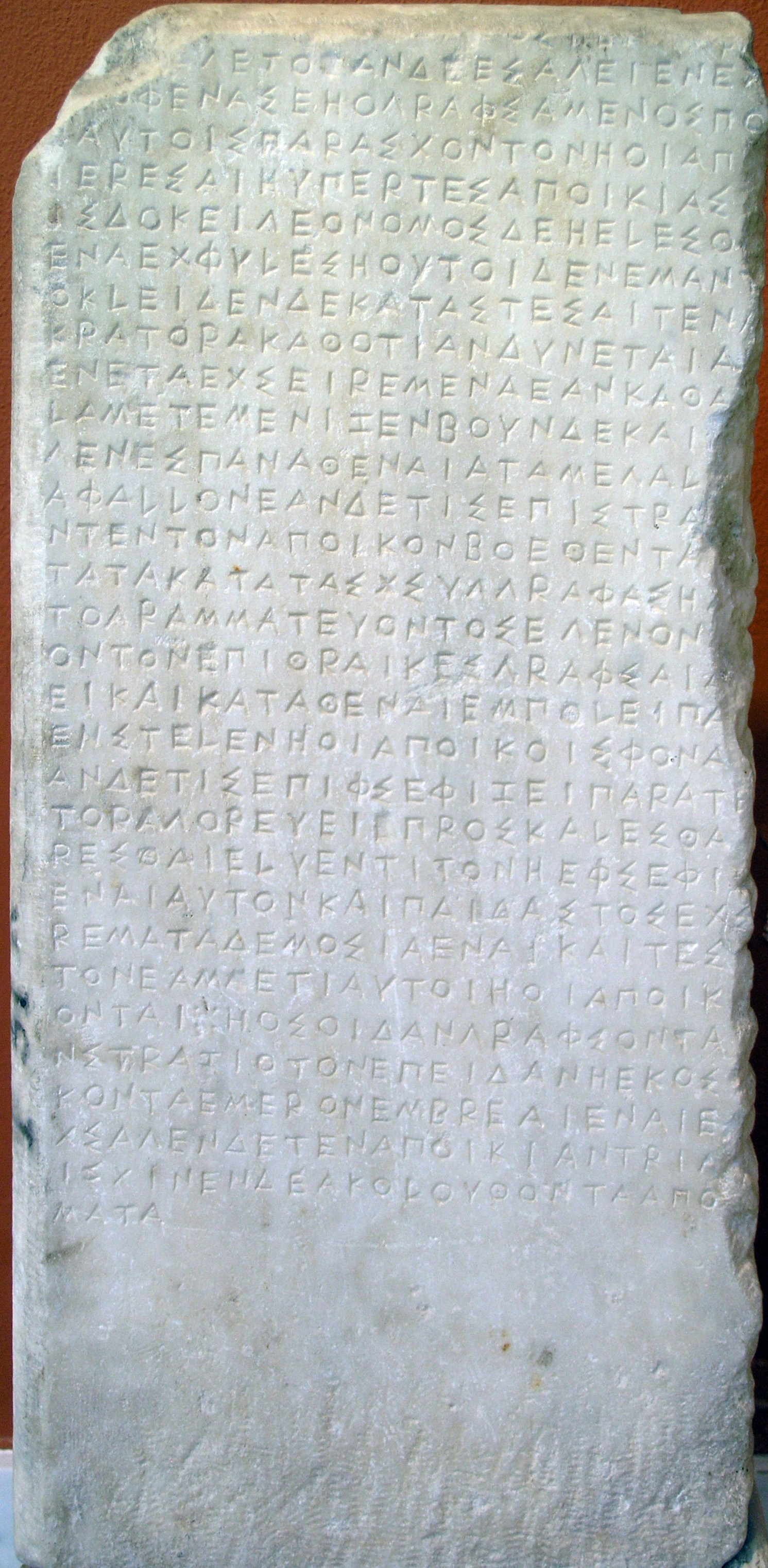

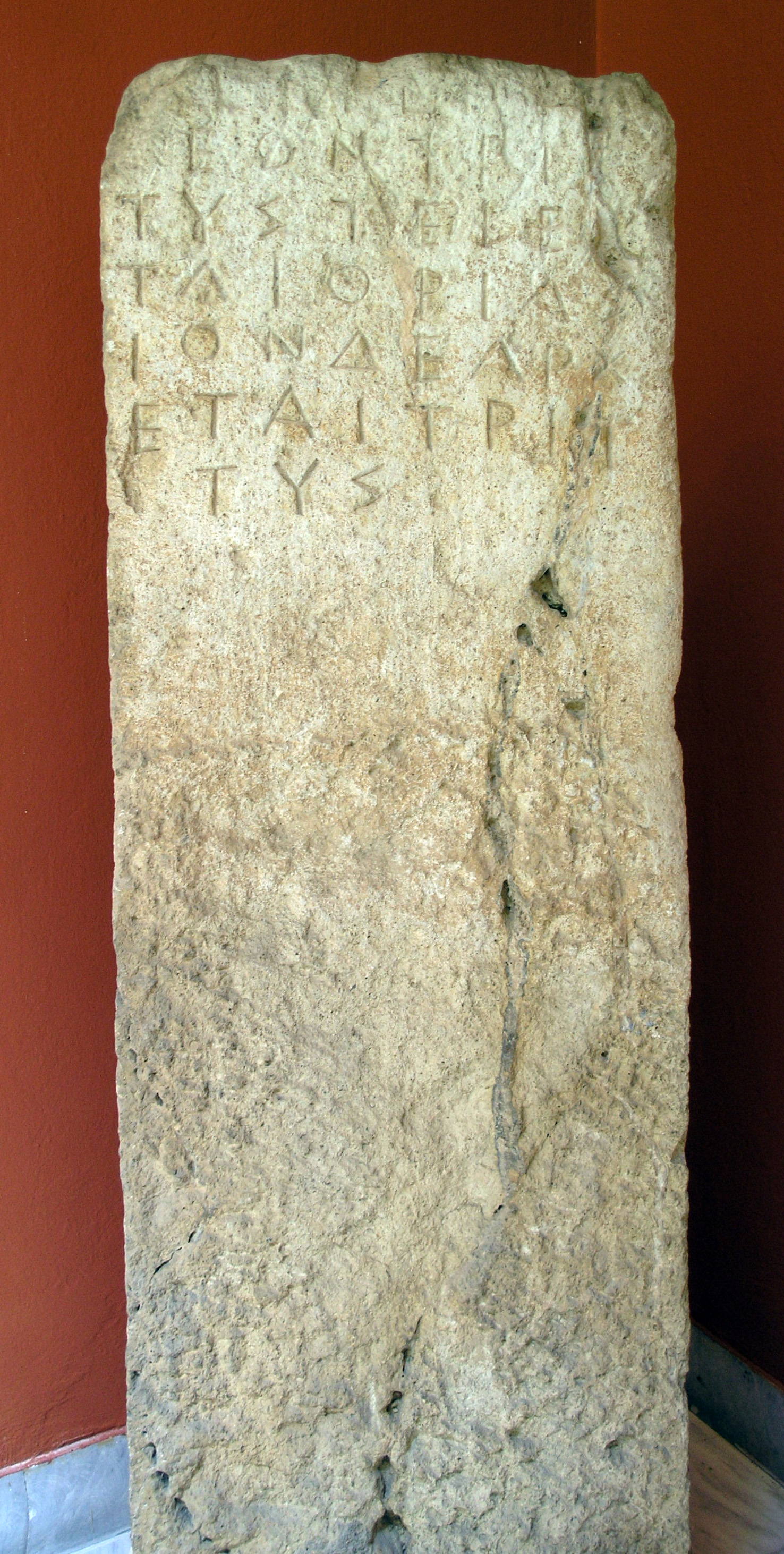

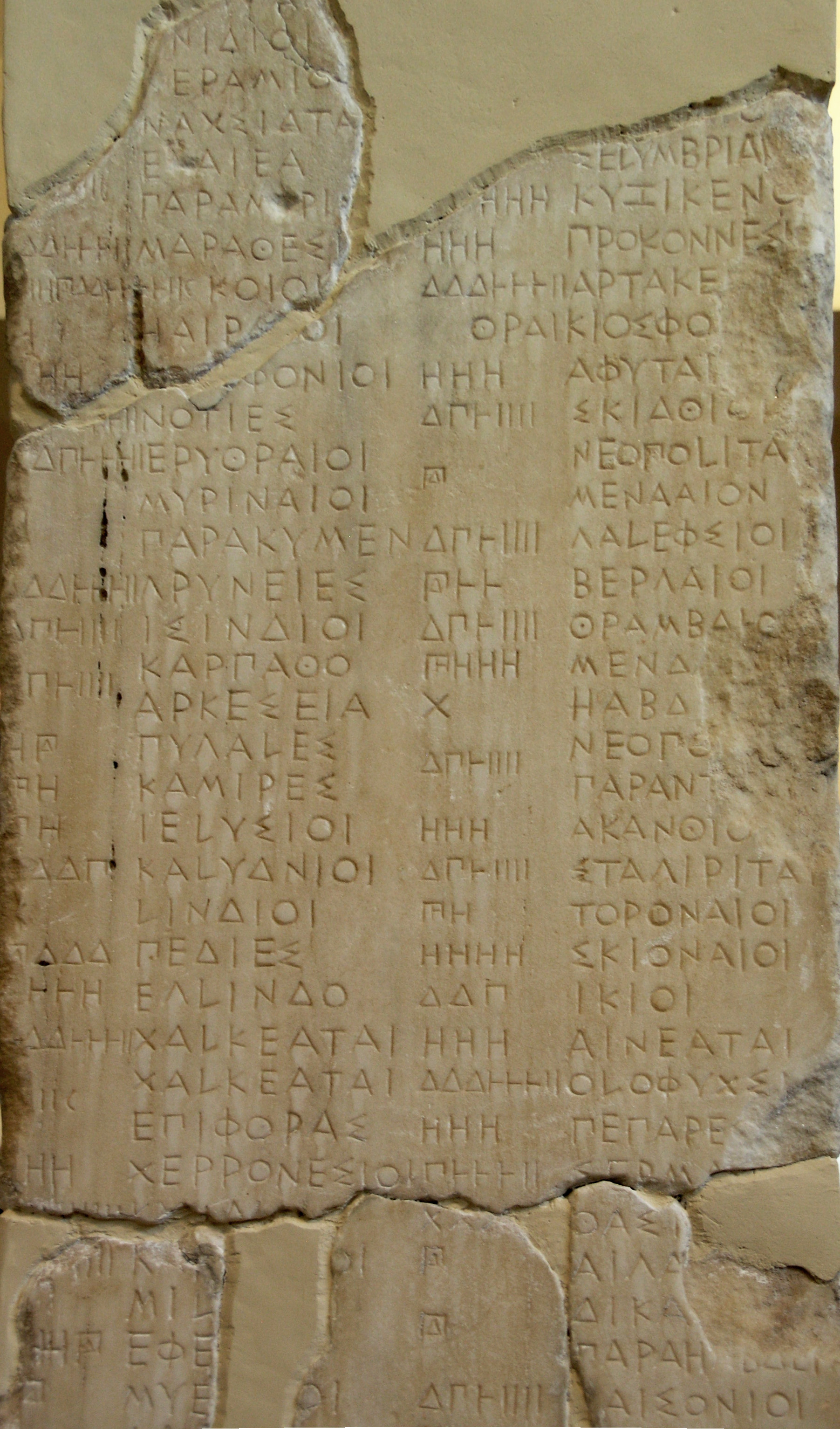

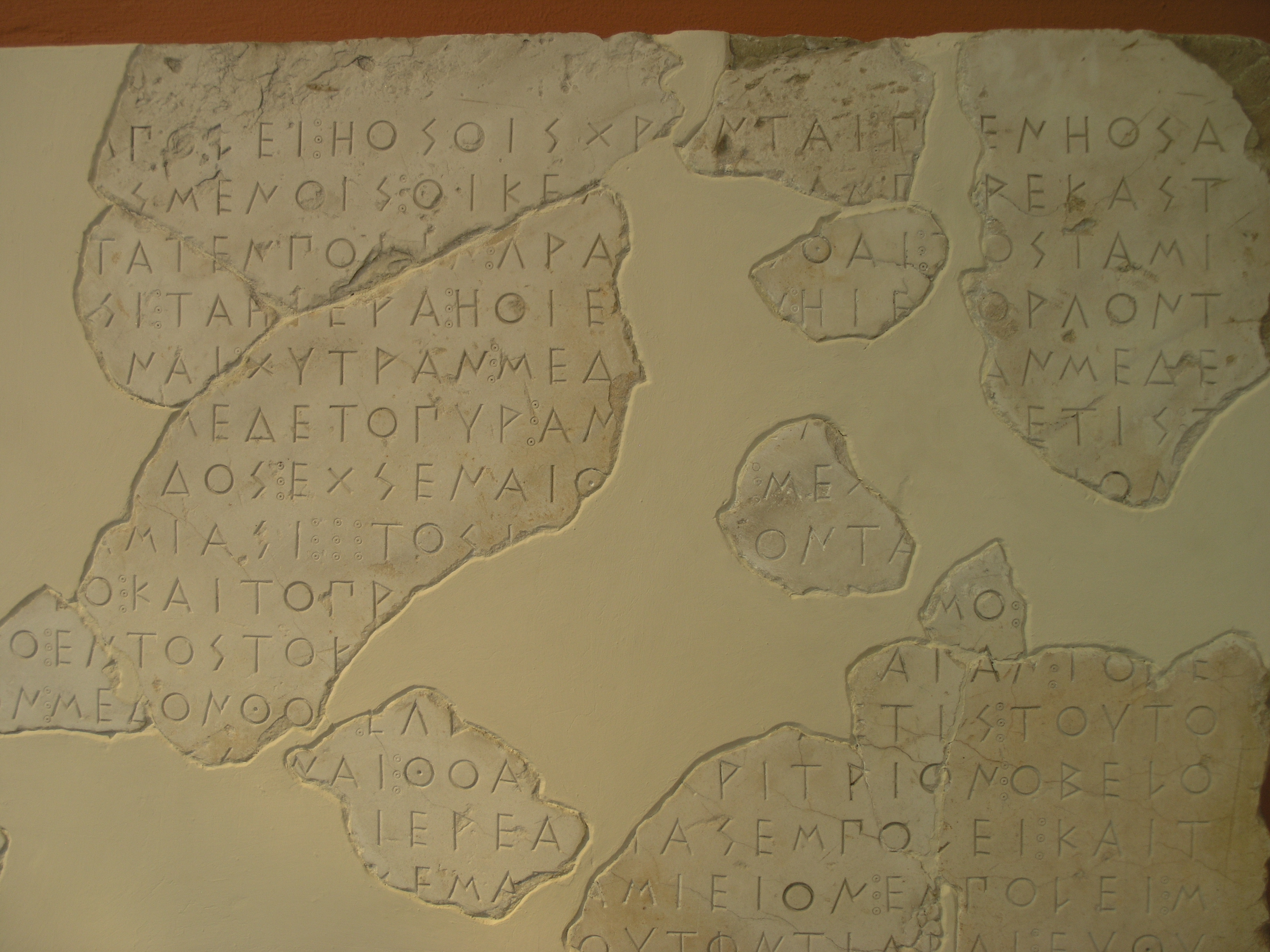

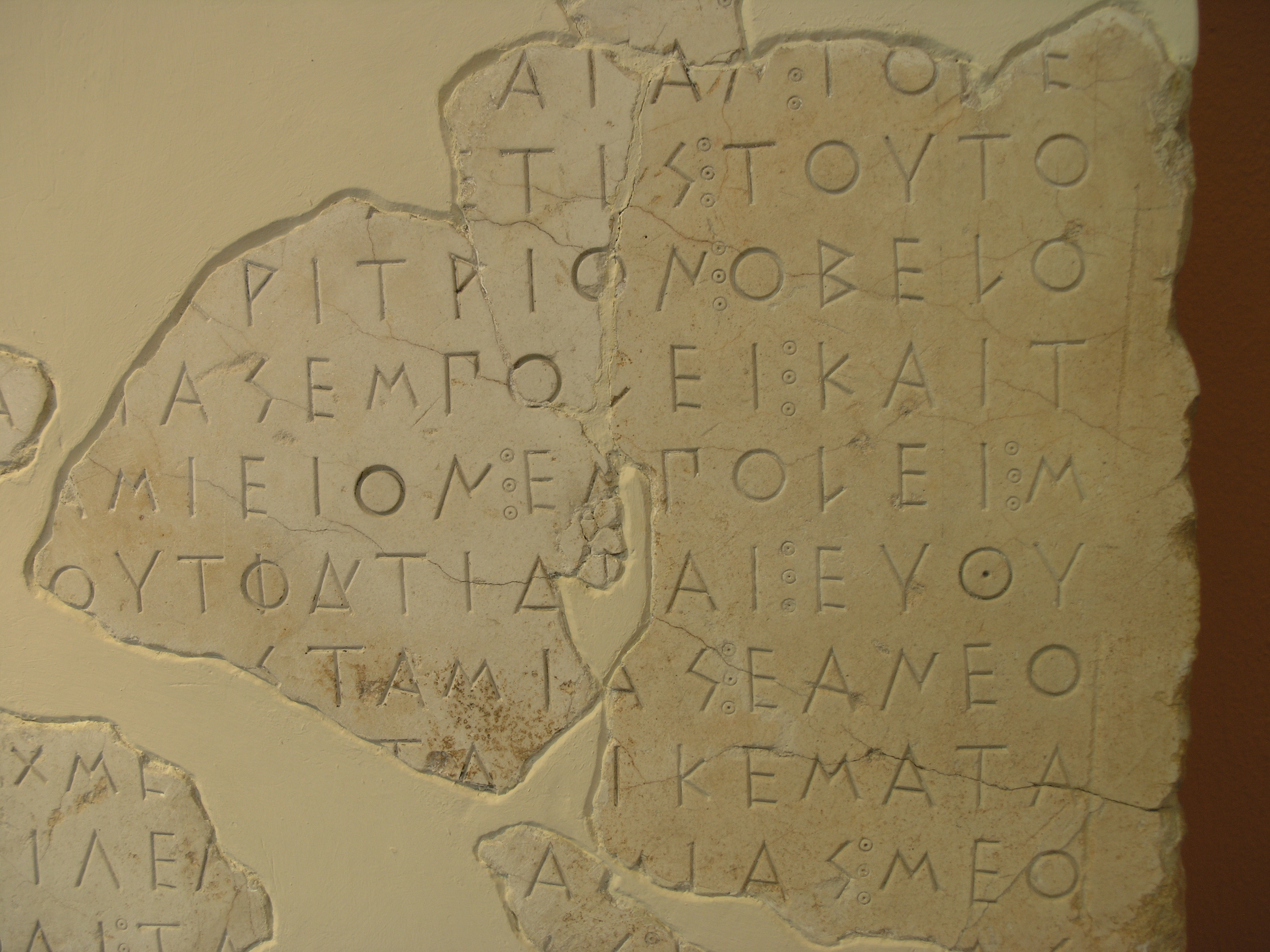

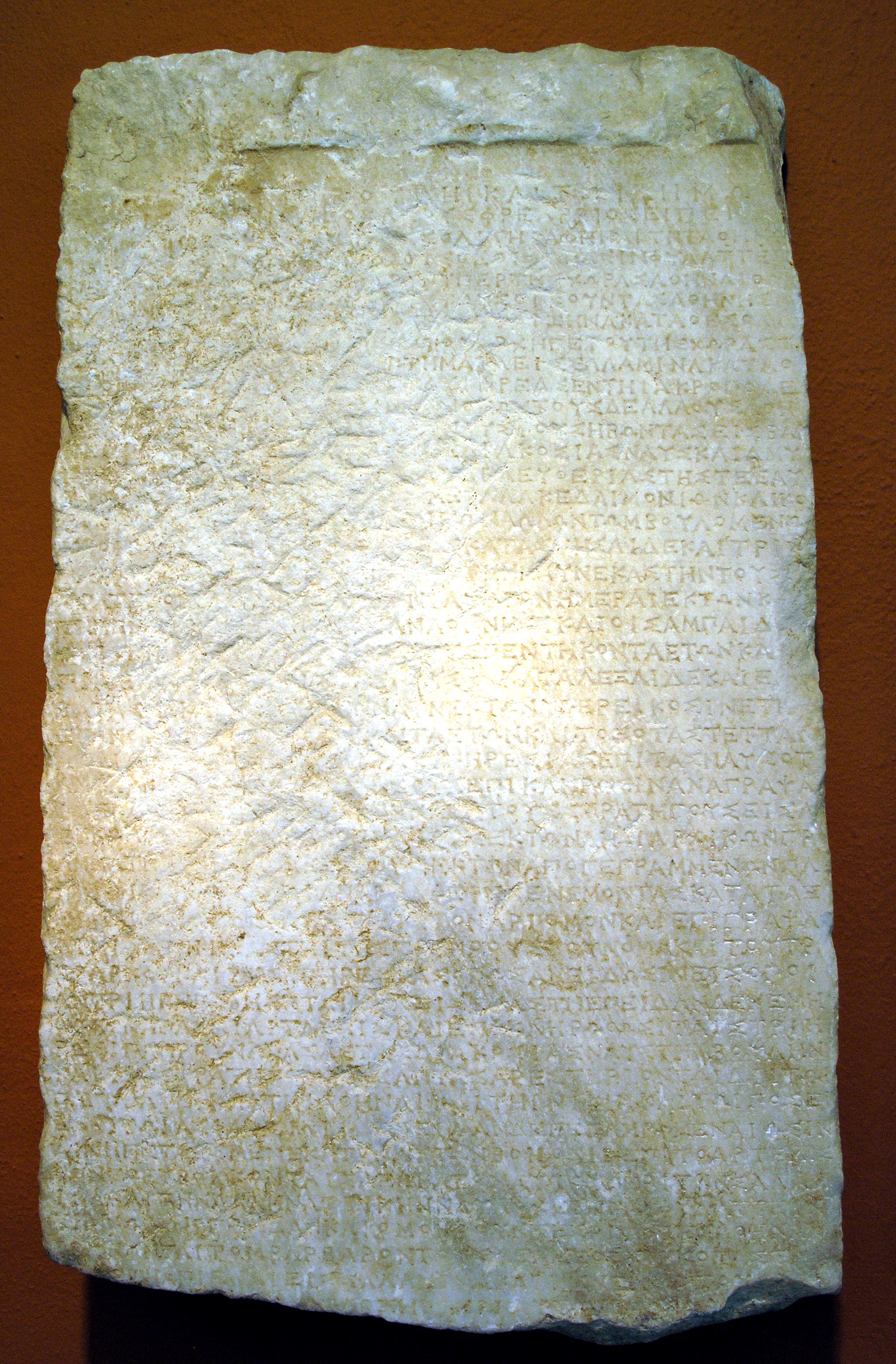

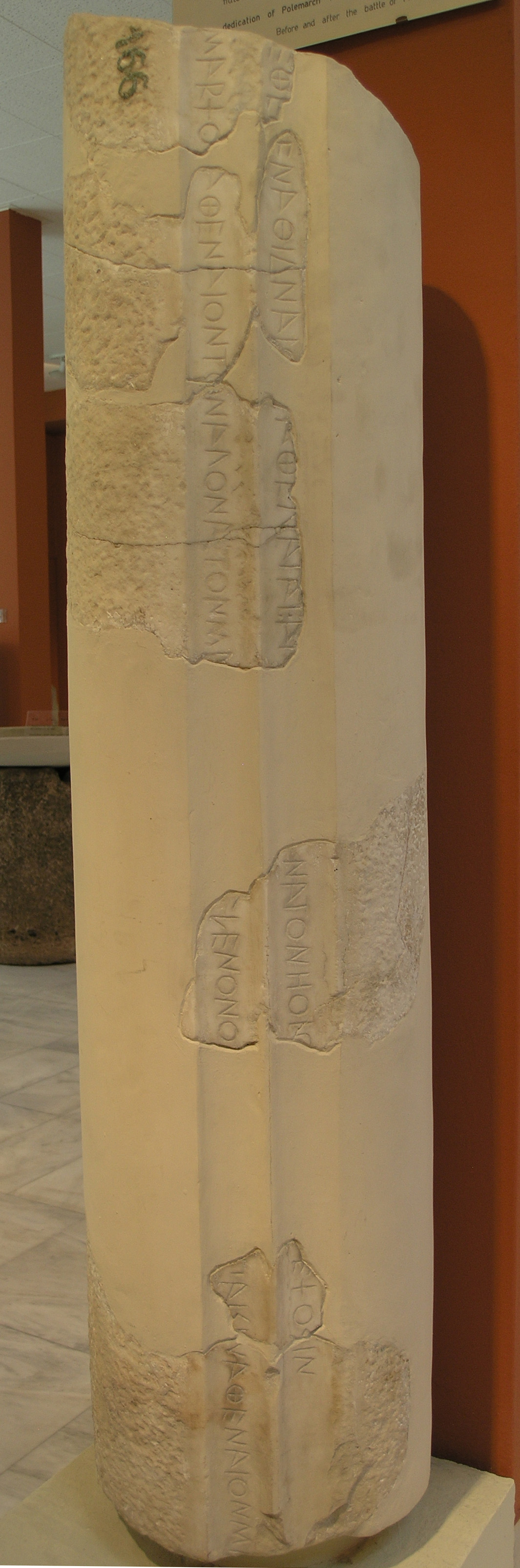
