= Polyphemos Painter =

Ancient Greek vase painter

External videos
- Eleusis Amphora, video, Smarthistory

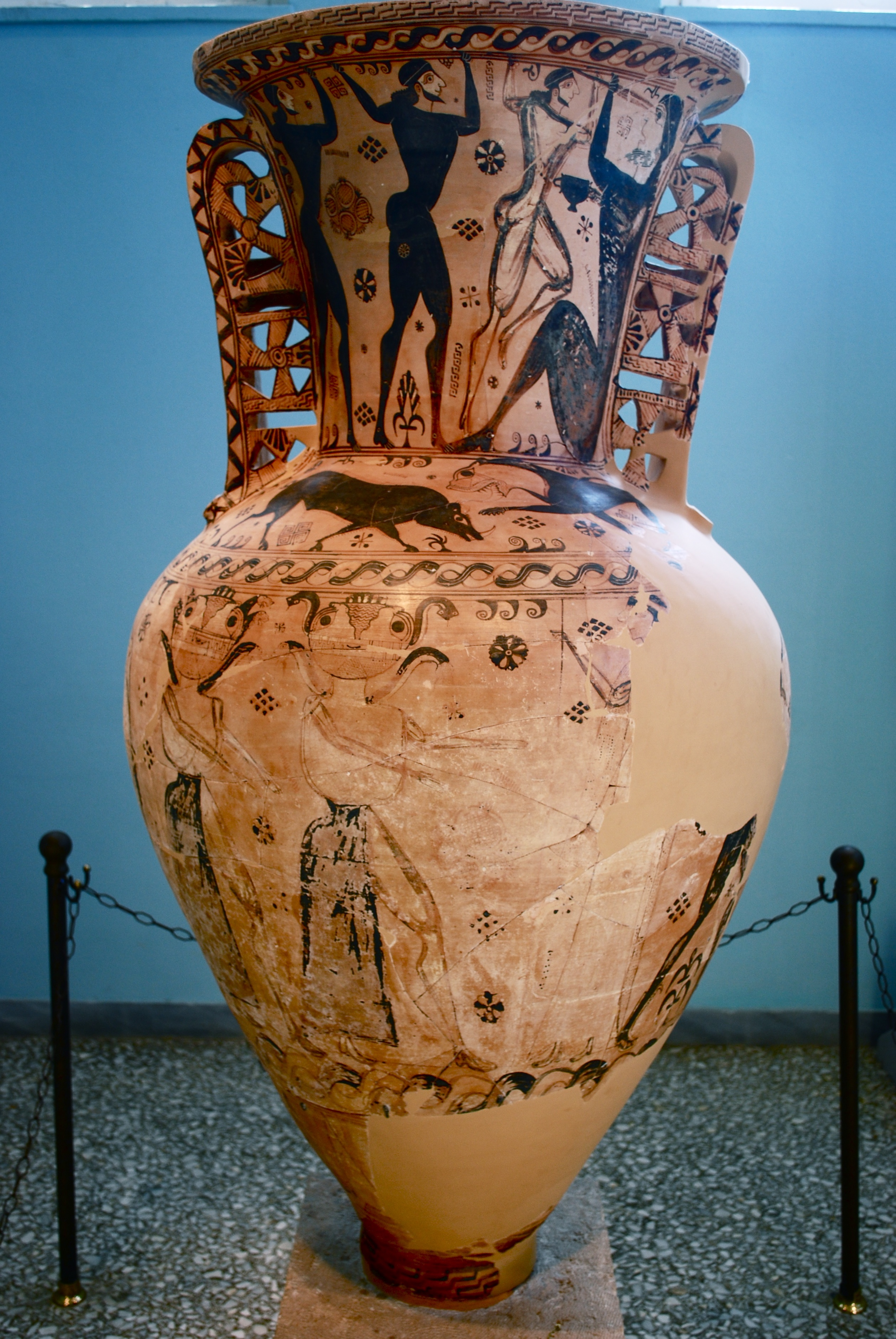
The Eleusis Amphora (c. 650–625 BC); Odysseus and his crew are blinding Polyphemus. Archaeological Museum of Eleusis, Inv. 2630.

The Polyphemos Painter (or Polyphemus Painter) was a high Proto-Attic vase painter, active in Athens or on Aegina. He is considered an innovator in Attic art, since he introduced several mythological themes. His works are dated to between 670 and 650 BC. It is likely that he was not only a vase painter, but also the potter of the vessels bearing his works.

== Naming ==
The Polyphemus Painter was probably a pupil of the Mesogeia Painter. His conventional name refers to his name vase, a neck amphora found at Eleusis, which had served as the funerary vase for a child. It is sometimes known as the Eleusis Amphora. The painting on the neck, depicting the blinding of Polyphemus, and that on the belly, showing Perseus and the gorgons, belong to the earliest identifiable depictions of scenes from Greek mythology.

== Menelas Stand ==
The Antikensammlung at Berlin once contained a clay stand, lost during World War II, known as the Menelas Stand, by the Polyphemus Painter. It depicts a group of men holding spears. The word Menelas, the Doric dialect form of Menelaus, is written next to one of the figures, forming the oldest known inscription in Attic art. The Doric dialect is unusual in Attica, but spoken on Aegina. Since all figures wear identical clothing, they may represent a chorus. Thus, it has been hypothesised that the inscription could also act as a kind of "speech bubble", as the lines of a chorus – in Greek drama, the chorus conventionally spoke Doric. However, this interpretation has been accepted by some and contested by other scholars, leaving it uncertain.

Before the identity of the painters of the Berlin and Eleusis pieces had been established, the Menelas Stand was sometimes ascribed to a hypothetical Menelas Painter.

== Literature ==
- Thomas Mannack in Griechische Vasenmalerei. Eine Einführung, Theiss, Stuttgart 2002, pp. 96–97, ISBN 3-8062-1743-2

== See also ==
- Orientalising Period
- Pottery of ancient Greece
