= Eleusis Amphora =

1st-century BC Greek amphora

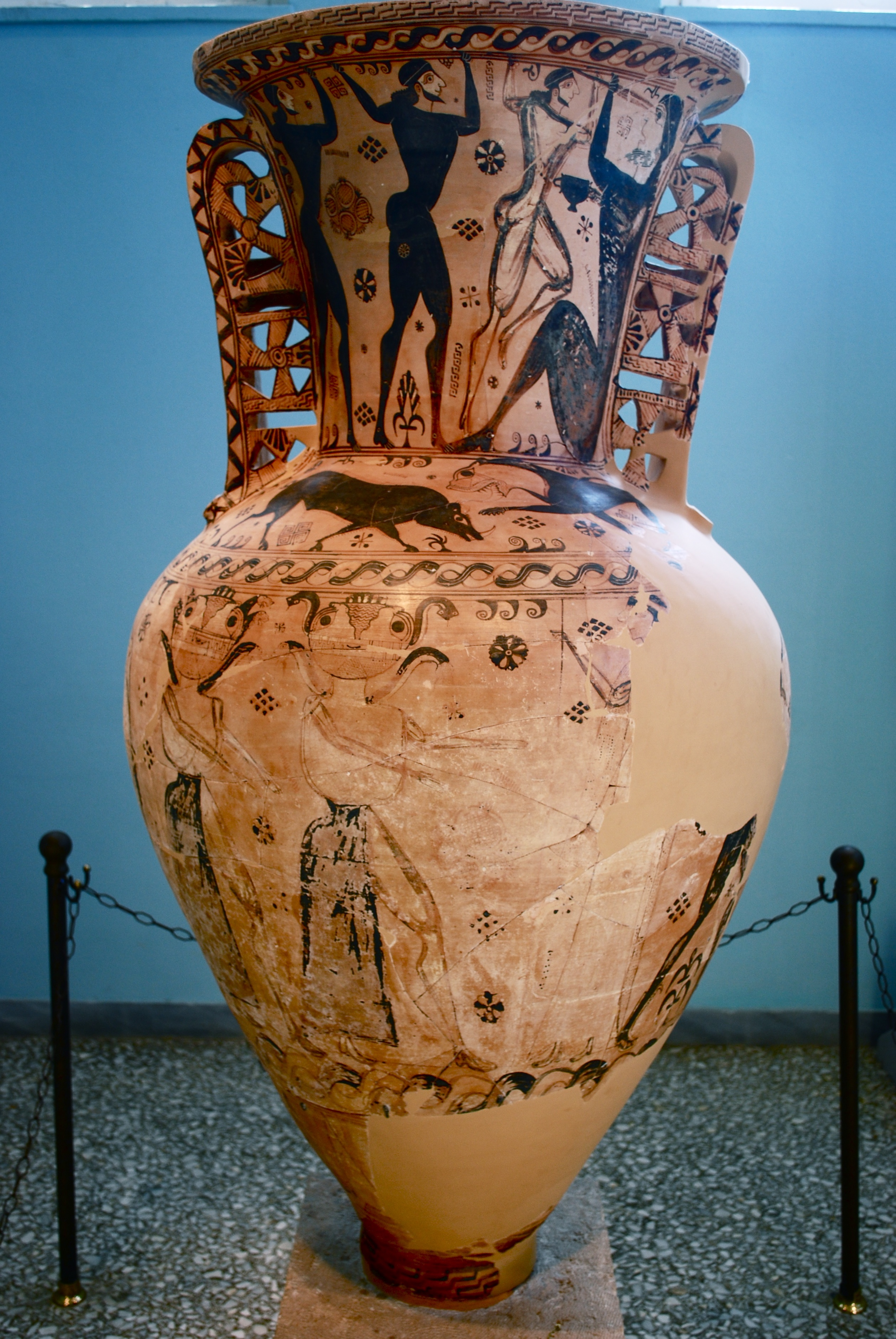
- Material: Clay
- Created: c. 638 BC by the Polyphemos Painter
- Discovered: before 1935; Greece
- Present location: Elefsina, Attica, Greece

The Eleusis Amphora is an ancient Greek neck amphora, now in the Archaeological Museum of Eleusis, that dates back to the Middle Protoattic (c. 650–625 BCE). The painter of the Eleusis Amphora is known as the Polyphemos Painter. It is decorated with black and white painted figures on a light colored background, which is characteristic of the "Black and White" style commonly seen in Middle Protoattic pottery. The amphora's decoration reflects the pottery of the Orientalizing period (c. 710–600 BCE), a style in which human and animal figures depict mythological scenes.

The figures depicted on the amphora include Odysseus, Polyphemus, Perseus, Athena, and Medusa's fellow gorgons. This amphora is the earliest known depiction of Athena in Attic art.

== Purpose ==
The size and shape of the amphora, as well as the fact that it is highly decorated, indicate that it was created as a tomb marker or monument. However, the remains of a 10–12-year-old boy were found inside the amphora, meaning that it was ultimately used as an urn. This type of urn burial was commonly used to bury the remains of children from the Iron Age (1100–900 BCE) to the Archaic period (600–500 BCE).

== Description ==
The Eleusis amphora shows some of the earliest artistic depictions of Greek mythology. On the neck of the vase, the figures depict Odysseus and his men blinding the cyclops Polyphemus. The register just below the neck shows a lion chasing a boar. Although it is hard to see because the amphora was found in pieces and then reconstructed, the central register shows Athena and Perseus escaping after Perseus beheads Medusa. This is the earliest known depiction of Athena in Attic art. The figures with cauldron-shaped heads are more gorgons, which are snake-headed creatures like Medusa.
