= Mesogeia Painter =

Unidentified ancient Greek vase painter

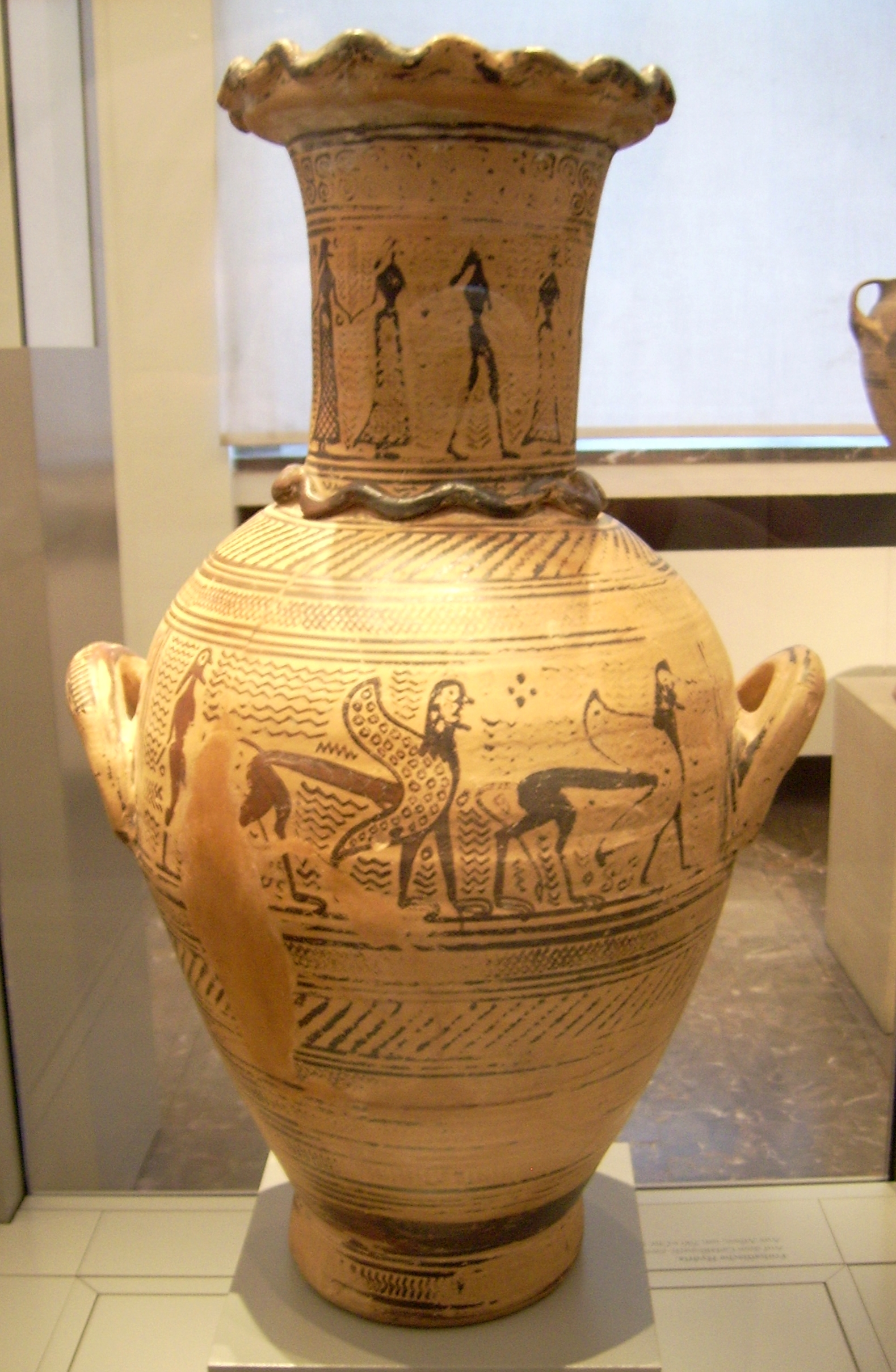
Early Proto-Attic hydria by the Mesogeia Painter, note applied plastic snakes on lip, neck and handle, suggesting a use in funerary cult; neck depicts women dancing with a youth, belly a man behind two sphinxes, circa 700 BC, from Athens, now Antikensammlung, Berlin.

The Mesogeia Painter, also Mesogaia Painter, was an Early Proto-Attic vase painter.

His conventional name is derived from his name vases, several hydriai decorated by him and discovered in the Mesogeia. This Early Proto-Attic artist was a contemporary of the Analatos Painter, active in the first quarter of the seventh century BC. It has been suggested that he was a pupil of the Late Geometric Statathou Painter, and the teacher of the High Proto-Attic Polyphemos Painter.

== Literature ==
- Thomas Mannack in Griechische Vasenmalerei. Eine Einführung, Theiss, Stuttgart 2002, p. 135 ISBN 3-8062-1743-2
- Cynthia King: More Pots by the Mesogeia Painter, in: American Journal of Archaeology, Vol 80 (1976), p. 79-82

== See also ==
- List of Greek vase painters
- Orientalizing period
- Pottery of ancient Greece
