= Taranto goddess =

Greek marble cult statue in Berlin

Taranto Goddess
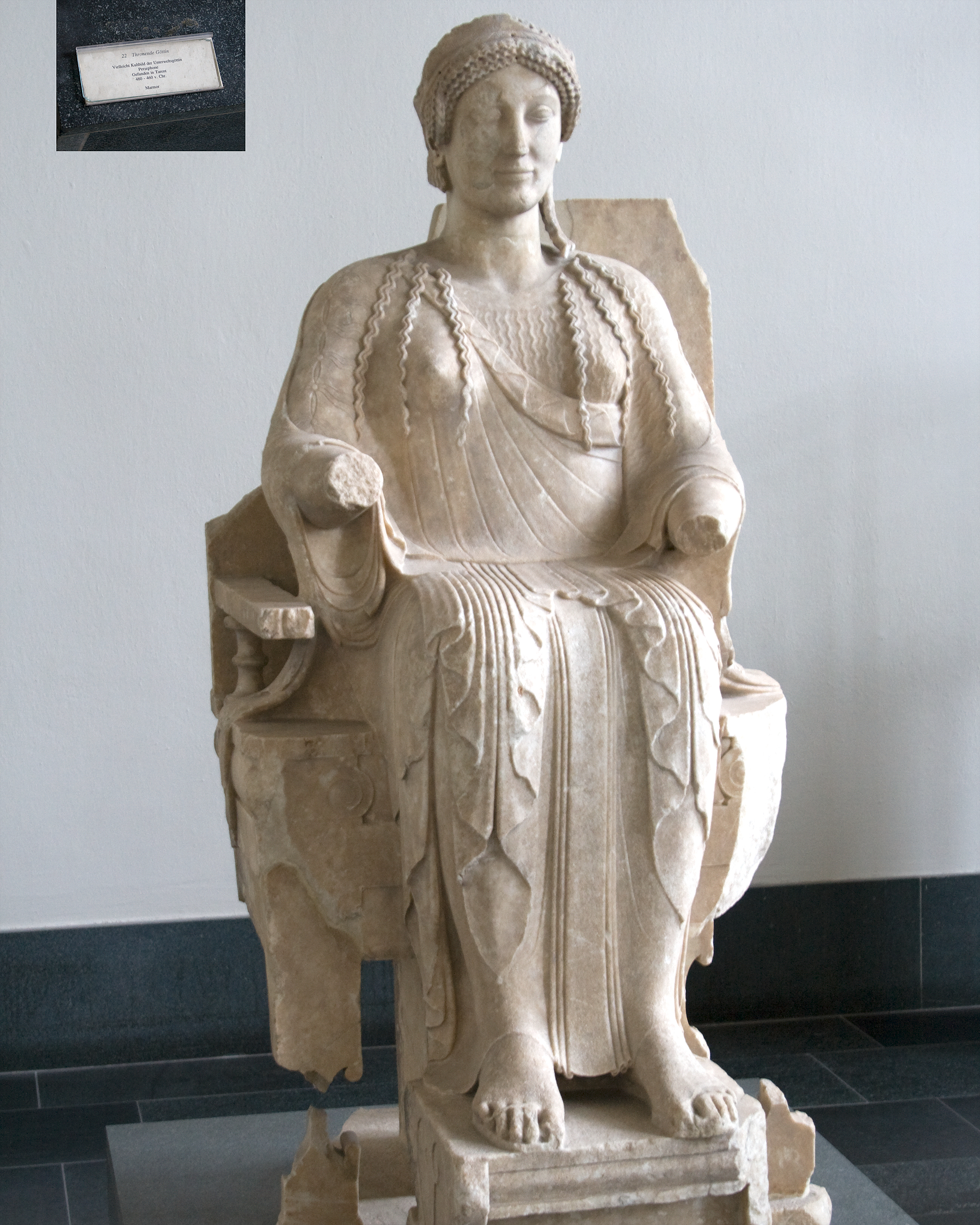
- The statue in the Antikensammlung Berlin
- Material: Marble
- Size: Height: 151 cm (59 in)
- Created: c. 475–450 BC
- Period/culture: Early Classical (Severe style)
- Discovered: 1911; Taranto, Italy
- Present location: Altes Museum, Berlin
- Identification: Sk 1761
- Culture: Magna Graecia (Western Greek)

The Taranto Goddess (German: Thronende Göttin von Tarent), also called the Enthroned Goddess of Tarentum, is a Greek marble statue of a seated goddess made in Magna Graecia in the second quarter of the 5th century BC. The 1.51-metre (4 ft 11 in) figure is thought to have been a cult image. It was reportedly found near Taranto (ancient Tarentum) in southern Italy in 1911, acquired by the Berlin museums in 1916, and is held by the Antikensammlung Berlin (inventory number Sk 1761), which displays it in the Altes Museum. Italian officials and scholars have questioned how the statue left Italy, and its return has been requested.

== Description ==
The goddess sits frontally on an ornate throne with a cushion and a high back, looking straight ahead. She wears sandals, a long-sleeved chiton, a mantle draped diagonally across the body and fastened with six brooches, and a veil over her back. Her hair is parted in the middle and falls in long braids. Holes in her diadem and earlobes show that metal ornaments were once attached; these are lost, as are both hands. The museum suggests that the right hand probably held an offering bowl (phiale). Faint traces of the original paint survive.

The statue is carved to be seen from the front. Its style combines the body treatment of the early Severe style with the rich drapery and serene expression of late Archaic sculpture. The Antikensammlung dates it to 475–450 BC; other sources place it soon after 480 BC.

== Identification ==
Because the figure has no surviving attributes, the goddess cannot be identified with certainty. Persephone, Hera and Aphrodite have all been proposed. Its identification as a cult image is supported by a terracotta mould from Taranto used to make statuettes of an enthroned goddess of the same type, which were dedicated in her sanctuary. Supporters of a Locrian origin associate the statue with the cult of Persephone, which is well attested there by the clay plaques (pinakes) of the early 5th century BC.

== Discovery and provenance ==
According to the museum, the statue was found in 1911 by workmen digging near Taranto, in a trench about 4 m (13 ft) deep where it had been hidden in antiquity. A competing account holds that a farmer found it in a vineyard at Locri in Calabria around 1905, and that it was later moved secretly to Taranto; a local man, Giovanni Giovinazzo, claimed to have witnessed the find. Findspots of antiquities sold on the market in this period were often assigned to well-known sites such as Taranto or Locri, which complicates the question.

The antiquities dealer Jacob Hirsch sold the statue to the Berlin museums, which acquired it in 1916. Virzì, a dealer involved in the illegal export of works from Magna Graecia, also played a part in the statue's sale. It was long displayed in the Pergamon Museum and is now shown in the Altes Museum as one of the highlights of the collection.

== Restitution claims ==
How the statue left Italy is unclear, and it is suspected of having been exported without authorization. Italian law already restricted the export of artworks before the find, including a law of 1871 and Law 364 of 1909. In 1997, Italian culture minister Walter Veltroni reportedly said that the statue could not be recovered for diplomatic reasons. In July 2022, Senator Margherita Corrado urged culture minister Dario Franceschini to consult experts, including the Carabinieri Command for the Protection of Cultural Heritage, and to set up a working group on the case.

== See also ==
- Berlin Goddess
- Ludovisi Throne
