= Mantiklos "Apollo" =

Ancient Greek sculpture

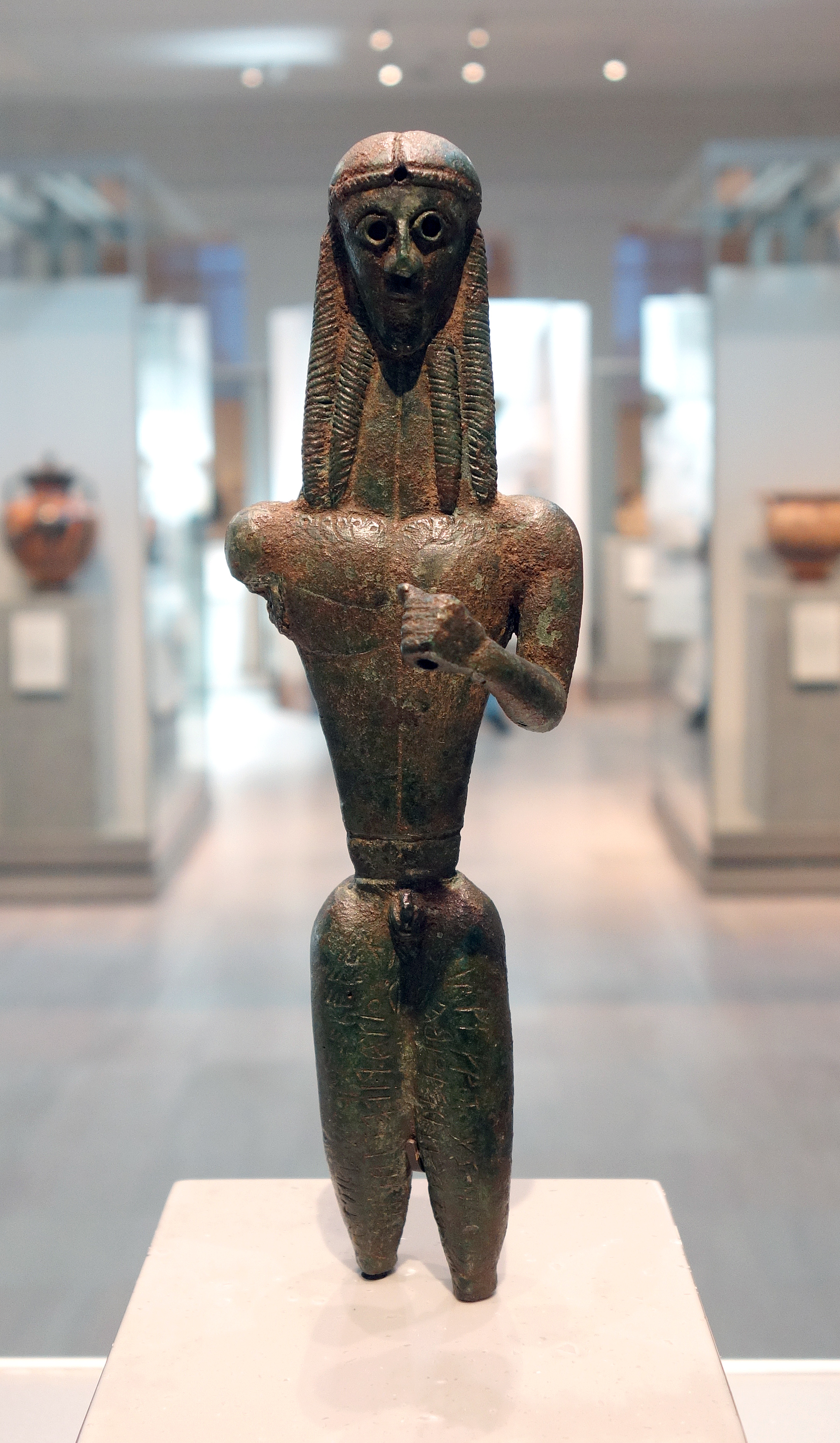
- Year: c. 700–675 BC
- Medium: Bronze
- Subject: Male figure
- Dimensions: 20.3 cm (8.0 in)
- Location: Museum of Fine Arts, Boston
- Accession: 03.997

The Mantiklos "Apollo" is an ancient Greek sculpture from the early Archaic period. The sculpture dates to about 700–675 BC from Thebes and measures 20.3 cm (8.0 in) tall. It is on display at the Museum of Fine Arts, Boston.

== Description ==
The sculpture, per the inscription on its thighs, is an offering to the god Apollo from Mantiklos. It is unclear whether the sculpture is meant to represent Mantiklos or Apollo. The sculpture's right arm is now lost; if the sculpture's right arm held a shield and spear, it would indicate that the sculpture represents Mantiklos, whereas a bow and arrow would indicate it represents Apollo.

The sculpture is significant for representing a transition from daedalic sculpture to more natural forms.
