= Korai of Ionia =

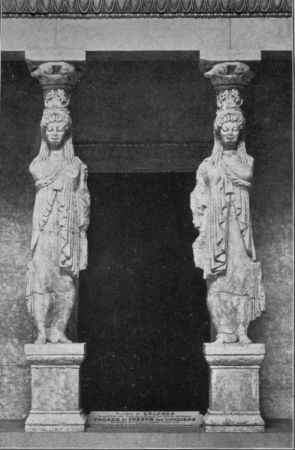
Caryatids from the Treasury of the Cnidians.

The Korai of Ionia were statues depicting female figures (korai), or Caryatids, and belonged to the collection of Ionian treasuries of the Oracle of Delphi. Already from the middle of the 6th century BC begins the construction of the first Ionic temples with statues of elegant girls on their façades which radiate a feeling of the East, brought from the coast of Asia Minor. The beautiful kore, who raises with her left hand the sheer, long and pleated chiton (tunic) and dates back, as the oldest one, to around 550 B.C. is attributed – with some doubt, however – to the Treasure of Knidos in Asia Minor.

Another kore/Caryatid stands out for its solid smirk on her face and the beautiful almond-shaped eyes. She comes from the façade of an Ionian Treasury that remains unidentified and seems to have been built around 530 B.C.

The details that give a sense of motion/vitality to the kore are very characteristic. Their hair are carved with patience and bear numerous holes, which served to secure the jewelry with which they were decorated. In fact, they were also decorated with added marble curls. Their chiton was rich in pleats which gave a strong sense of life and motion to the statues. All of these features are thus evidence that testify to the wealth of decorative arts and the mastery of the craftsmen of the era.
