= Dedication of Nikandre =

Greek marble sculpture

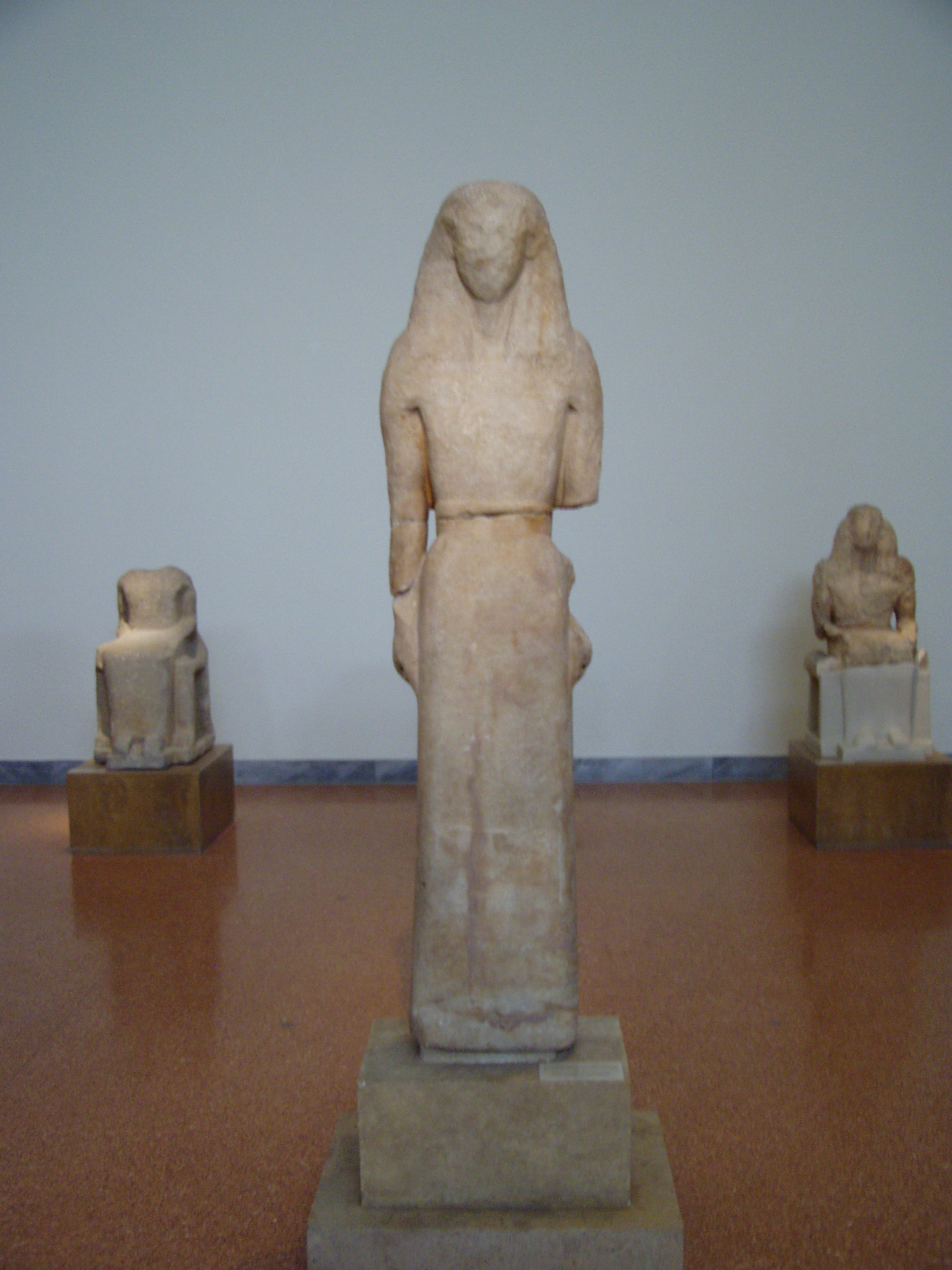
Statue of Nikandre

The Dedication of Nikandre is a Greek marble sculpture, made approximately around 650 BCE, held in the National Archaeological Museum, Athens, Greece (Inv. 1). Nikandre, a woman from the island of Naxos, dedicated the statue in the temple of Artemis at Delos, the birthplace of Apollo and Artemis. The statue, which was found during archaeological excavation in the 19th century, is one of the earliest surviving korai, or statues of women, and displays one of the oldest inscriptions of Ancient Greek in stone. Its representation and its placement within the existing stylistic periods of Greek sculpture have become the subject of extensive scholarship.

== Discovery ==
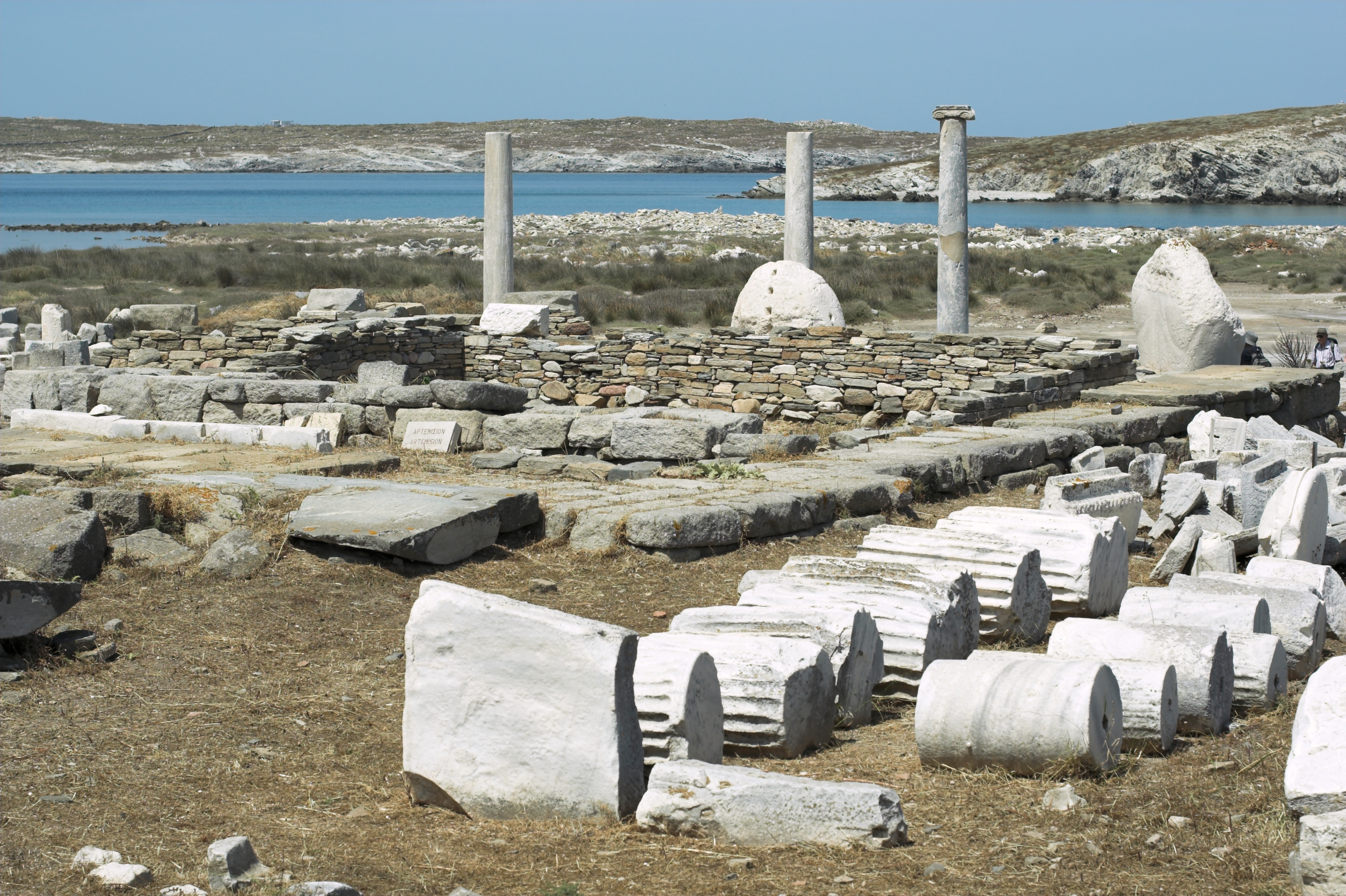
Temple of Artemis, Delos, where Nikandre's kore was discovered

Théophile Homolle uncovered the statue amongst several other sculptural pieces in ditches while excavating around the sanctuary of Artemis in 1878. Homolle himself published slightly contradictory notes regarding the find spot of the pieces that make up Nikandre's dedication during the years following the discovery. As such, scholars have not been able to definitively place the location of Nikandre's dedication. On the basis of Homolle's notes, however, most agree that the statue was deposited in a ditch some 12 to 15 meters from the corner of the sanctuary of Artemis along with the pieces of several other statues. The purpose of this deposit is unclear, but the statues appear to have been broken before burial.

== Inscription ==
On the left side of the statue is the dedicatory inscription, one of the earliest surviving inscriptions of Greek in stone. It is incised vertically, in a manner known as boustrophedon. The original Greek is as follows: «Νικάνδρη μἀνέθεκεν (ε)κηβόλοι ἰοχεαίρηι Κόρη Δεινοδίκηο το Ναησίο ἒησοχος ἀλήον Δεινομένεος δὲ κασιγνέτη Φηράησο δ᾽ ἂλοχος ν[ῦν].» An English translation, provided by G. M. A. Richter, is: "Nikandre dedicated me to the goddess, far-shooter of arrows, Nikandre, the daughter of Deinodikos of Naxos, distinguished among women, sister of Deinomenes and wife of Phraxos."

From this inscription, we know the name and gender of the dedicant, Nikandre, as well as some vague hint of her intention (to please the goddess). In addition to defining herself by her relationship to her father (Deinodikos), husband (Phraxos), and brother (Deinomenes), she refers to herself as "distinguished among women", claiming some amount of glory and emphasizing her reputation in her community. Though the inscription may imply that the statue was made on the island of Naxos, where Nikandre's family resided (an implication corroborated by the type of stone used to make the statue), it is unclear who the sculptor was or where he lived.

== Representation ==
Scholars have yet to reach a consensus regarding whom the statue represents. Although it is tempting to initially assume that a dedicant, such as Nikandre, would commission a statue in her own likeness, the number of surviving female statues with male dedicants indicates that while possible in some situations, this could not be the general rule.

In an article published three years after the discovery, Homolle proposed that Nikandre's dedication as well as the other statues found with it each represent Artemis. For most korai, the prevailing assumption is that they represent Persephone, but they could represent whichever goddess was worshiped at the sanctuary where the statues were dedicated, including Artemis, Hera, Athena, Demeter, and even nymphs. However, as G. M. A. Richter has pointed out, rarely are the individual korai accompanied by the appropriate attributes and objects that cult statues usually display, such as Athena's aegis on her statue in the Parthenon. That being said, Nikandre's statue does have small holes in the center of its hands. It is possible that the sculptor could have made these holes to attach objects associated with Artemis, such as a bow, to the statue's hands.

Korai could alternatively represent the priestesses of those goddesses and sanctuaries. This interpretation has found quite a following among scholars. For example, John Boardman and Nigel Spivey both posit that the statue represents a priestess of Artemis. Opponents to this theory argue that the youthful depiction of the korai is generally not associated with the image and the stature of a priestess, though there are instances of young maidens serving as priestesses (e.g. the worship of Artemis at Brauron).

== Stylistic period ==
One of the major controversies regarding Nikandre's dedication revolves around its placement within preexisting categories of Greek sculpture, specifically the Daedalic style of the 7th century BCE or the Greek Monumental Period that followed.

The Daedalic style, exhibited by followers of the mythological inventor Daedalus (the so-called Daidalidai, such as Endios, Dipoino, Skyllis, Tektaios, et al.), flourished between 675 and 600 BCE. The style is characterised by strict frontality, and a distinctive style of hair and clothing. Nikandre's dedication conforms to many of these stylistic features, with its strict frontality (the statue faces straight forward without any twisting of the body), its rigid and unrevealing dress (a peplos belted at the waist), and its neatly combed hair, which hangs in tresses on either side of the figure's head.

The Greek Monumental Period (660–650 BCE) was marked by life-sized sculpture, the origins of which several scholars trace to Greek cultural interaction with Egypt and Mesopotamia. Homolle noted in his initial publication of the Nikandre sculpture that "the hair is spread out on the shoulders, pretty much in the manner of the hairstyle of the Egyptians - which at first sight gives our statue the look of an Egyptian work." Nikandre's dedication, which stands 1.75 metres (5 ft 9 in) tall and 0.17 m (6.7 in) thick, is one of the earliest life-size marble sculptures to survive intact and many have therefore attributed it to the start of this new period of Archaic monumental sculpture.

== Reception ==
In discussing the "problem of description" in archaeology, A. A. Donohue has shown that historically, most scholars have described Nikandre's dedication in negative terms. Donohue holds that the "objective" description of archaeological objects has been anything but. Through an evaluation of the historical, ethnic, and psychological context of scholarly criticisms of the statue, Donohue illustrates how the reception of Nikandre's dedication today should not necessarily build on previous descriptions, which have often scorned the flat nature of the work and the heavy dress as poor craftsmanship. In comparison with later Hellenistic sculpture, which is characterized by a progressively idealistic treatment of the human form, Nikandre's dedication, with its heavy garment and blockish torso, appeared to many early scholars as wholly unfeminine. In contrast, Donohue argues that the heavy clothing and stance of the figure were meant to convey the respectability and stature of the female within her society.

== See also ==
- Lady of Auxerre
- List of ancient Greek and Roman monoliths
- Mosaics of Delos
