= Powder, Copper, Coal and Otto =

Mascots of the 2002 Winter Olympics and Paralympics in Salt Lake City

Powder, Copper and Coal

Mascots of the 2002 Winter Olympics (Salt Lake City)
- Creator: Steve Small
- Significance: A snowshoe hare (Powder), a coyote (Copper) and an American black bear (Coal) named after three Utah natural resources

Otto

Mascot of the 2002 Winter Paralympics (Salt Lake City)
- Creator: Steve Small
- Significance: A sea otter named after the Italian word for eight

Powder, Copper and Coal were the official mascots of the 2002 Winter Olympics and Otto was the official mascot of the 2002 Winter Paralympics, both held in Salt Lake City, United States.

== Design history ==
The design process for the mascots began in September 1997, and after prototypes were created, the International Olympic Committee (IOC) approved the mascots in December 1998. The Salt Lake Organizing Committee (SLOC) worked with Landor Associates of San Francisco, California, and Publicis to design and market the mascots.

The original illustrator of the mascots was Steve Small, known for his work on Rugrats and Disney's Hercules. For the 2002 Winter Paralympic Games, SLOC subsequently requested Small, Landor and Publicis for the creation of a new mascot along the creative lines of Powder, Copper and Coal. They created "Otto", an otter that was designed to convey the agility and vitality of the athletes.

=== Unveiling ===
All three mascots were publicly unveiled during a celebration on May 15, 1999, at the Triad Center in downtown Salt Lake City. This celebration was hosted by Olympian Kristi Yamaguchi and also celebrated 1,000 remaining days until the start of the 2002 games. The mascots were unveiled during the ceremony as actor and American Indian Billy Daydodge narrated the mascots' stories (which are based on legends from American Indian traditions).

On September 25, 1999, the names of the mascots were announced during a BYU Football game, in Provo, Utah (prior to this only the type of animals and their legends were known). Utah schoolchildren had originally suggested names for the mascots, and the top picks were then publicly voted on; the first in Olympic history.

== Mascots ==
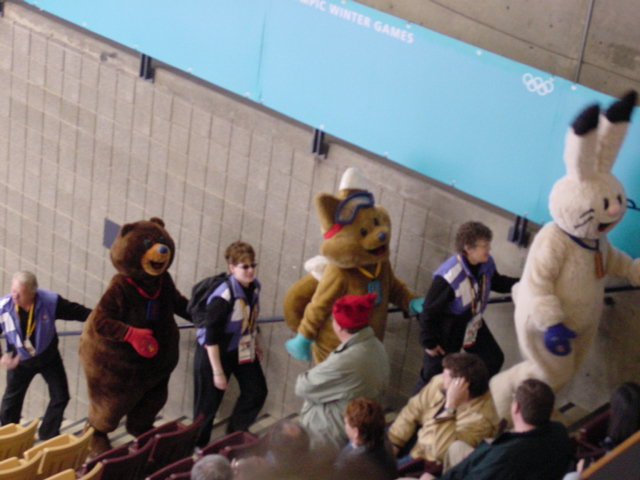
Costumes of the Olympic mascots in 2002

The mascots are indigenous animals of the Western U.S., and are named after natural resources (except for Otto) which have long been important to Utah's economy, survival, and culture. All four animals are major characters in the legends of local American Indians, and each mascot (except for Otto) wears a charm around its neck with an original Anasazi or Fremont-style petroglyph to remind them of their heritage.

=== Powder ===
Powder is a snowshoe hare originating from Fishlake National Forest. She is depicted as a fast and agile athlete, with large, furry feet suited to movement on snow and ice; Powder can ski and skate circles around her competition because she is quick and elusive. Powder represents the "Faster" element of the Olympic motto.

The sun was too close to the earth and was burning it. The hare (Powder's ancestor) ran to the top of a mountain, and shot her arrow into the sun. This caused it to drop lower in the sky, cooling the earth. Her favorite color is purple/blue shade as seen on her gloves and badge. She tends to love ice cream especially those around the world. She is one of the three Olympic mascots, one of the four mascots of Salt Lake City 2002 and is also the only female of the four mascots of Salt Lake City 2002.

Her name comes from powder snow.

=== Copper ===
Copper is a coyote character depicted as an athletic and energetic mascot known for his outgoing personality and competitive nature. He is associated with Glen Canyon National Recreation Area. The character is portrayed as confident and media-friendly, with a performance style intended to entertain spectators during sporting events. Copper is also associated with winter sports such as Ice Hockey and Curling.

The earth froze and turned dark, the coyote (Copper's ancestor) climbed to the highest mountaintop and stole a flame from the fire people. He returned and brought warmth and light to the people. Because of the way his ancestor did, Copper represents Higher from the Olympic motto. His favorite color is turquoise green as seen on his gloves and badge. He tends to love Jell-O. He is one of the three Olympic mascots and one of the four mascots of Salt Lake City 2002.

His name comes from the mineral of the same name.

=== Coal ===
Coal is considered to be one of the three official mascots of the Winter Olympic Games. Presented as an American black bear hailing from the Flaming Gorge Reservoir area, the official narrative behind this mascot revolves around the importance of conservation and winter sports. This mascot is built with an athletic, low center of gravity design meant to portray such events as Alpine skiing and speed skating.

Indigenous people respected and revered bears. There were many mysteries surrounding bear hibernation and as a result, the animals were often viewed as symbols of immortality. Because bears are capable of standing on their hind legs, Native Americans sometimes referred to them as cousins. One popular legend is that a group of hunters who were never able to kill a mighty bear (Coal's ancestor). Today the sons of these hunters still chase the bear across the night sky as constellations. Because of his irreversible and undoubted strength, Coal represents Stronger from the Olympic motto. His favorite color is red as seen on his badge and gloves. He has an affinity for French fries or any other potato dishes.

His name comes from the mineral of the same name.

=== Otto ===
Otto is a friendly sea otter. He is an only pup and lives with his parents in the at Wasatch Mountains. Otto loves to eat fish and sometimes uses tools to help him get to his meals. His best friends are children and Chris Waddell. He loves to do para-alpine skiing and ice sledge hockey.

Otto is the only Paralympic mascot of the four mascots of Salt Lake City 2002, and represents agility and resistance. According to the International Paralympic Committee, the otter was chosen, in part, to highlight the reintroduction of otters into the wild after nearly being driven to extinction in the 20th century.

== Notes ==
Preceded by Olly, Syd and Millie	Olympic mascot Powder, Copper and Coal; Salt Lake City 2002	Succeeded by Athena and Phevos
Preceded by Lizzie	Paralympic mascot Otto; Salt Lake City 2002	Succeeded by Proteas
