= Athena, Phevos and Proteas =

Mascots of the 2004 Summer Olympics and Paralympics in Athens

Athena and Phevos Αθηνά και Φοίβος (in Greek)

Mascots of the 2004 Summer Olympics (Athens)
- Creator: Spyros Gogos
- Significance: Two modern children resembling ancient Greek terracotta daidala

Proteas Πρωτέας (in Greek)

Mascots of the 2004 Summer Paralympics (Athens)
- Creator: Spyros Gogos
- Significance: A seahorse

Athena and Phevos (Greek: Αθηνά, Φοίβος; pronounced [aθiˈna] and [ˈfivos]) were the official mascots of the 2004 Summer Olympics and Proteas (Greek: Πρωτέας, [proˈte.as]) was the official mascot of the 2004 Summer Paralympics, both held in Athens, Greece.

Athena and Phevos are one of the few examples of anthropomorphic mascots in the history of the Olympics. According to the official mascot webpage, "their creation was inspired by an ancient Greek doll and their names are linked to ancient Greece, yet the two siblings are children of modern times - Athena and Phevos represent the link between Greek history and the modern Olympic Games."

The Athens 2004 Olympic Organizing Committee claimed that the mascots represented "participation, brotherhood, equality, cooperation, fair play [and] the everlasting Greek value of human scale."

For the Paralympic Games, ATHOC subsequently requested Gogos for the creation of a new mascot along the creative lines of Athena and Phevos. He created Proteas, a seahorse that is to convey the nature of the competitions and the athletes’ constant goal of achieving excellency. The name of the Paralympic mascot originates from the Greek word ‘’protos’’, which mean ‘’first rank’’ or ‘’excellent’’. The concept of seahorse was chosen by the designer Gogos, since it is relatable to the sea – a vital element of Greek mythology, often associated with peace, balance, strengths.

The mascots have been emblazoned on a variety of items for sale, including pins, clothing and other memorabilia.

== History ==
An international competition for the design of the Olympic mascots was launched by the Athens Organizing Committee for the Olympic Games (ATHOC) on 26 February 2001: on 18 May 2001, ATHOC shortlisted seven proposals out of the 127 entries that met the initial requirements. The winning proposal, submitted by Spyros Gogos of Paragraph Design Limited, was announced on 26 October 2001.

Athena and Phevos was unveiled to the public on 4 April 2002, followed by Proteas on 17 September 2003.

== Design ==
=== Athena and Phevos ===
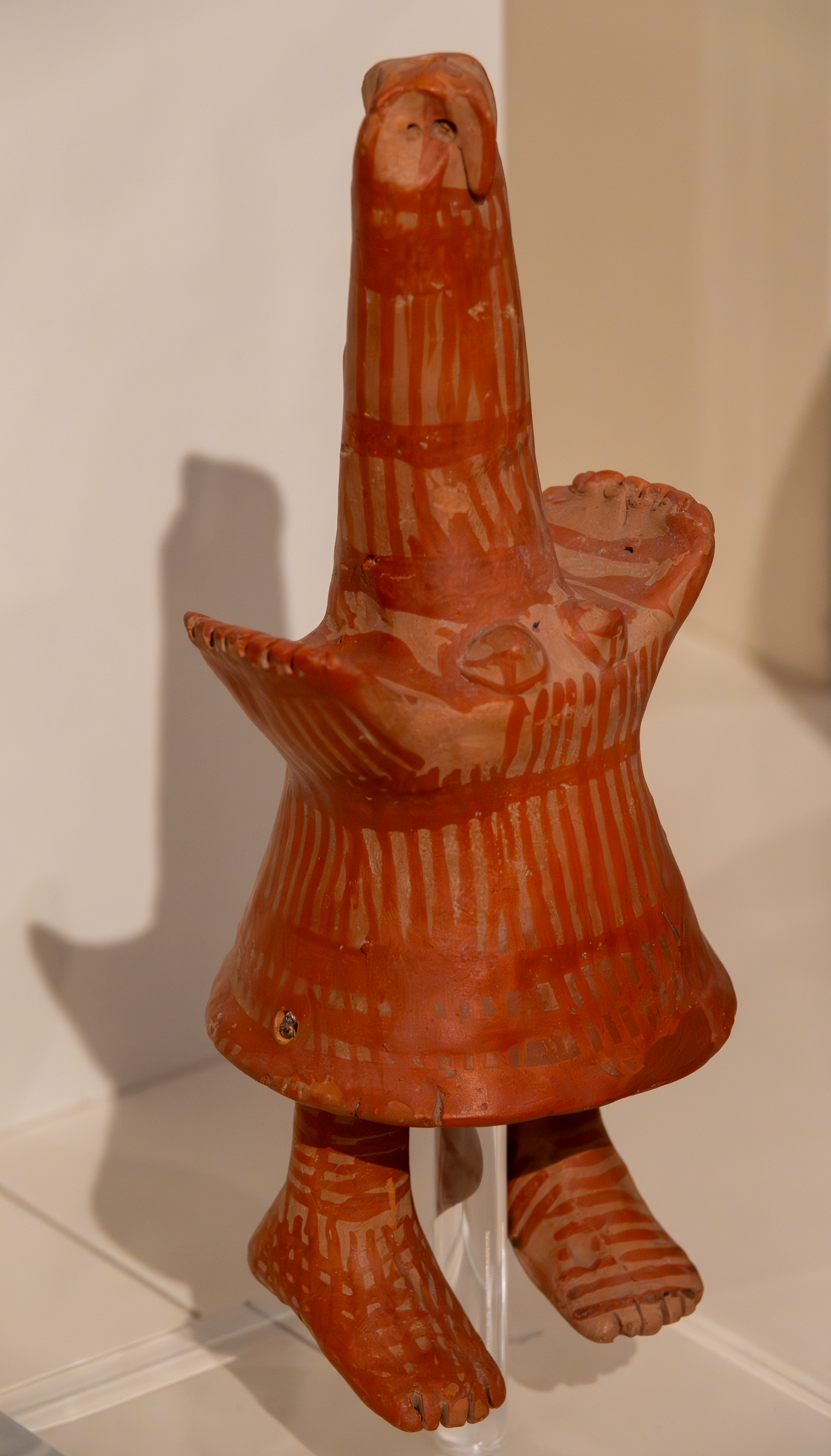
The Olympic mascots were based on this archaic terracotta daidala at the National Archaeological Museum of Athens.

The mascots were named after the Greek gods Athena and Apollo, Phevos being a transcription of the modern Greek pronunciation of Phoebus, an epithet of Apollo.

The design of Athena and Phevos are based on an ancient Greek terracotta daidala from the 7th century BC, which was recommended by curators at the National Archaeological Museum: they have long heads with outlined and stylised hair, big feet, and wear a tunic with a section of the kotinos in the background; Athena has a round nose, and wears an orange collared tunic with stylised breasts (based on the Archaeological Museum doll) and the logo at the bottom left; Phevos has an ear and pointed nose, and wears a plain blue tunic with the logo at the middle. The wordmark and rings are omitted if they appear less than 40 millimetres (1.6 in) high in publications, and the kotinos pattern is also omitted if less than 15 millimetres (0.59 in). The mascots wear a red tunic when practising equestrian events and modern pentathlon, and a white tunic for badminton, fencing, judo (Athena only), swimming, tennis, taekwondo and water polo.

=== Proteas ===
Proteas is the official mascot of the Athens 2004 Paralympic Games. The mascot is a seahorse and represents strength, pursuit, inspiration, and celebration. Proteas is coloured in red, green and blue, showcasing the three Tae Geukes (currently named as the ‘’Agitos’’) - the logo of the International Paralympic Committee.

=== Typeface ===
An unnamed (as of October 2026) casual script typeface was created for use with the mascots, such as their names: the typeface, notable for the lowercase "l" resembling the litre sign (ℓ), supported both Greek and Latin script.

== Reception and controversy ==
Reception was mostly positive, though there were some negative reviews including one that compared them to "melted Bart Simpson dolls".

Prior to the Games, a group affiliated with the Societas Hellenica Antiquariorum called the Greek Society of the Friends of the Ancients and a Hellenic polytheistic group called the Committee for the Greek Religion Dodecatheon, devoted to the preservation of ancient Greek culture, sued over the mascots, claiming that they "savagely insult" Classical Greek culture. In a BBC Radio interview on June 26, 2004, Dr. Pan. Marinis, President of the Societas Hellenica Antiquariorum, said that the mascots "mock the spiritual values of the Hellenic Civilization by degrading these same holy personalities that were revered during the ancient Olympic Games. For these reasons we have proceeded to legal action demanding the punishment of those responsible." The fact that the organizing committee referred to the daidala as dolls has been the cause of some controversy among scholars of Ancient Greek culture, as the daidala were religious artifacts.

== See also ==
- National Archaeological Museum of Athens

== Notes ==
| Preceded by Powder, Copper and Coal | Olympic mascot Athena and Phevos; Athens 2004 | Succeeded by Neve and Gliz |
| Preceded by Otto | Paralympic mascot Proteas; Athens 2004 | Succeeded by Aster |
