= Analatos Painter =

Unidentified ancient Greek vase painter

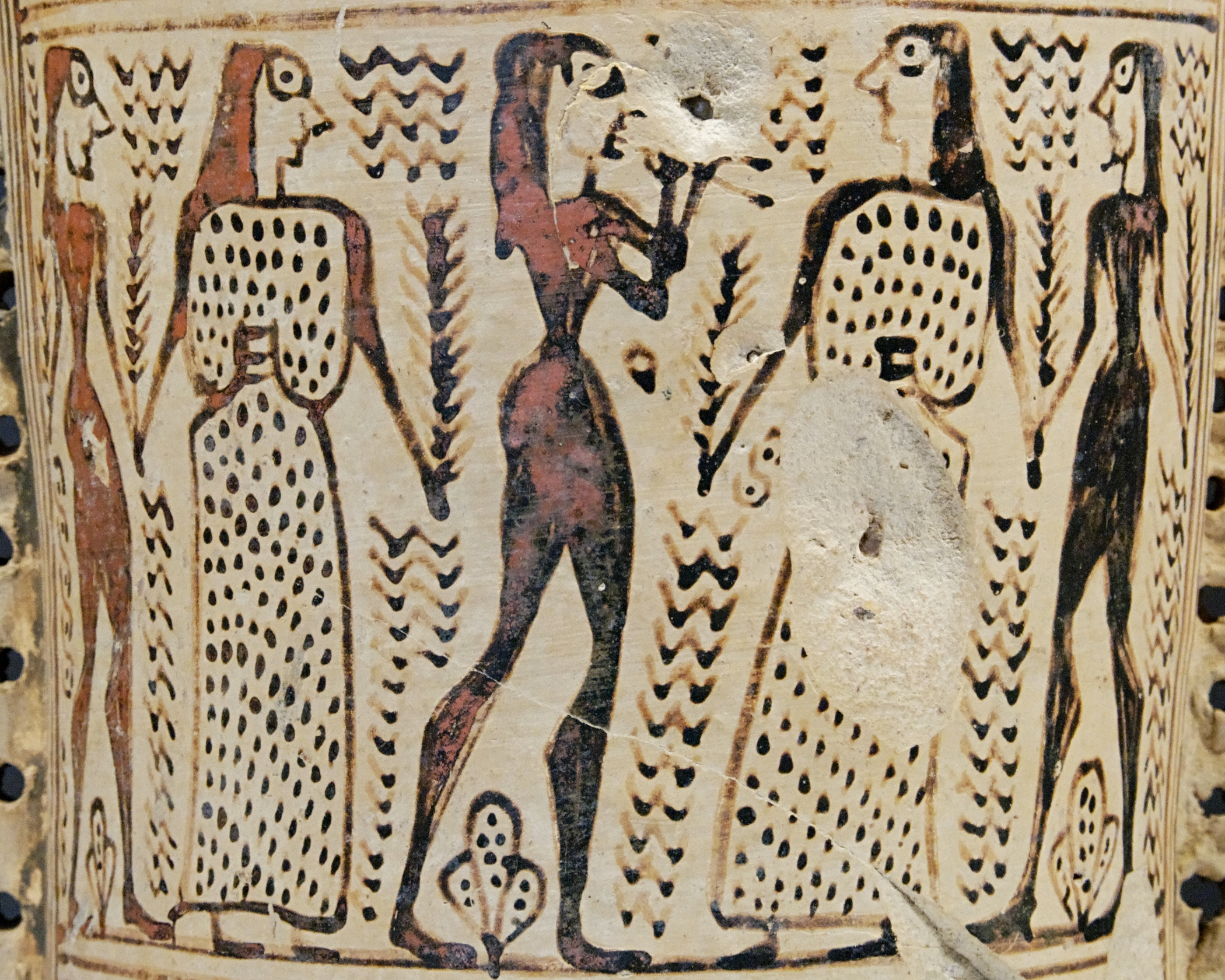
Couples dancing to the sound of the aulos on a loutrophoros, ca. 690 BC, Louvre.

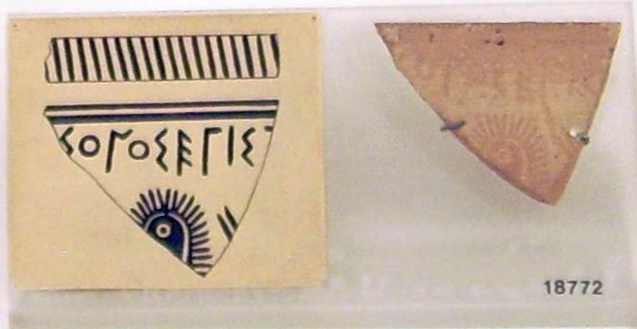
Fragment of a votive plaque bearing the oldest known painted Greek inscription, circa 700–675 BC, found on Aegina. Athens: National Archaeological Museum.

The Analatos Painter was an Attic vase painter of the Early Proto-Attic style.

The name of the Analatos Painter is derived from the central Attic area of Analatos (today Nea Smyrni), where several of his works have been excavated. His name vase is a hydria. His period of activity is estimated to be similar to that of the Mesogeia Painter, between c. 700 and 675 BC. It is possible that the Analatos Painter was also a potter.

The Analatos Painter belongs to the transition from Late Geometric to Early Proto-Attic vase painting. He is thought to have been a pupil of the Late Geometric Statathou Painter. The earliest works ascribed to him are still within a clear Late Geometric tradition. For example, one of his Geometric hydriai depicts a prothesis (laying-out of a body), showing Egyptian influences. The adoption of eastern influences was a key feature of the subsequent Orientalising Period, of which the Analatos Painter was one of the main early proponents. Characteristic of this new style were fantastic animals, sphinxes without wings or faces, rows of dancing men or women, cable patterns and rosettes. His oldest known amphora, now in the Ashmolean Museum shows a row of two-horsed chariots on its belly, as does a loutrophoros in the Louvre and several other pieces. In the execution of detail, he frequently followed older precepts.

Besides amphorae and hydriai, he also painted kraters, bowls and lids. A votive plaque attributed to him bears the inscription ΣΟΝΟΣΈΠΙΣΤ ((...)SONOS EPIST(AMENOS): "under the direction of ...son (Name)"), indicating that he was literate; it is the oldest known painted inscription in Greek.

== Literature ==
- John Boardman: Early Greek Vase Painting. 11th to 6th Century BC. A Handbook, Thames and Hudson, London 1998 (World of Art), 89 ISBN 0-500-20309-1
- Thomas Mannack: Griechische Vasenmalerei. Eine Einführung. Theiss, Stuttgart 2002, p. 95f. ISBN 3-8062-1743-2.

== See also ==
- List of Greek vase painters
- Orientalizing period
- Pottery of ancient Greece
