= Orientalizing period =

Phase in the Archaic period of ancient Greek art

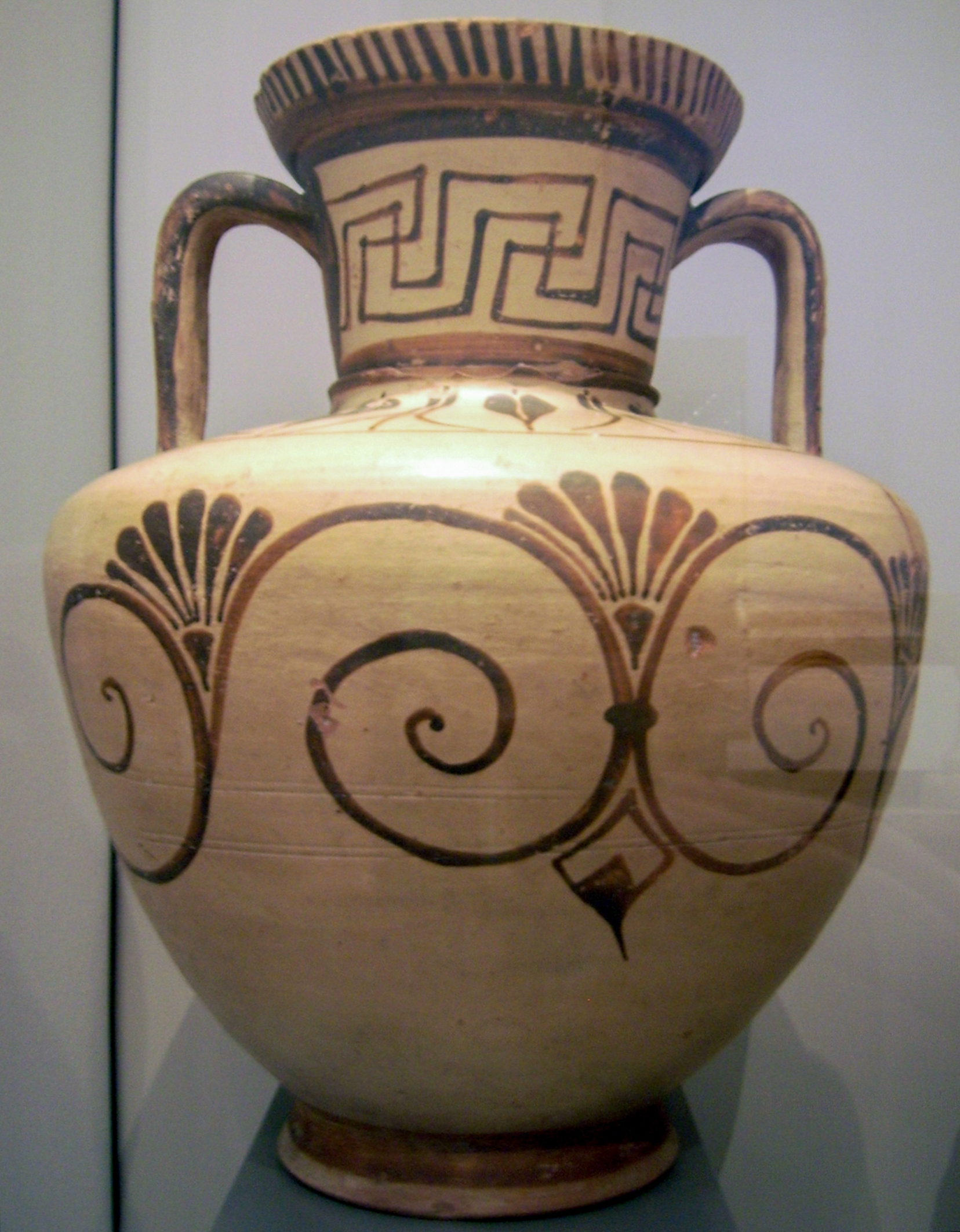
New motifs on an East Greek vase: the palmette and volute

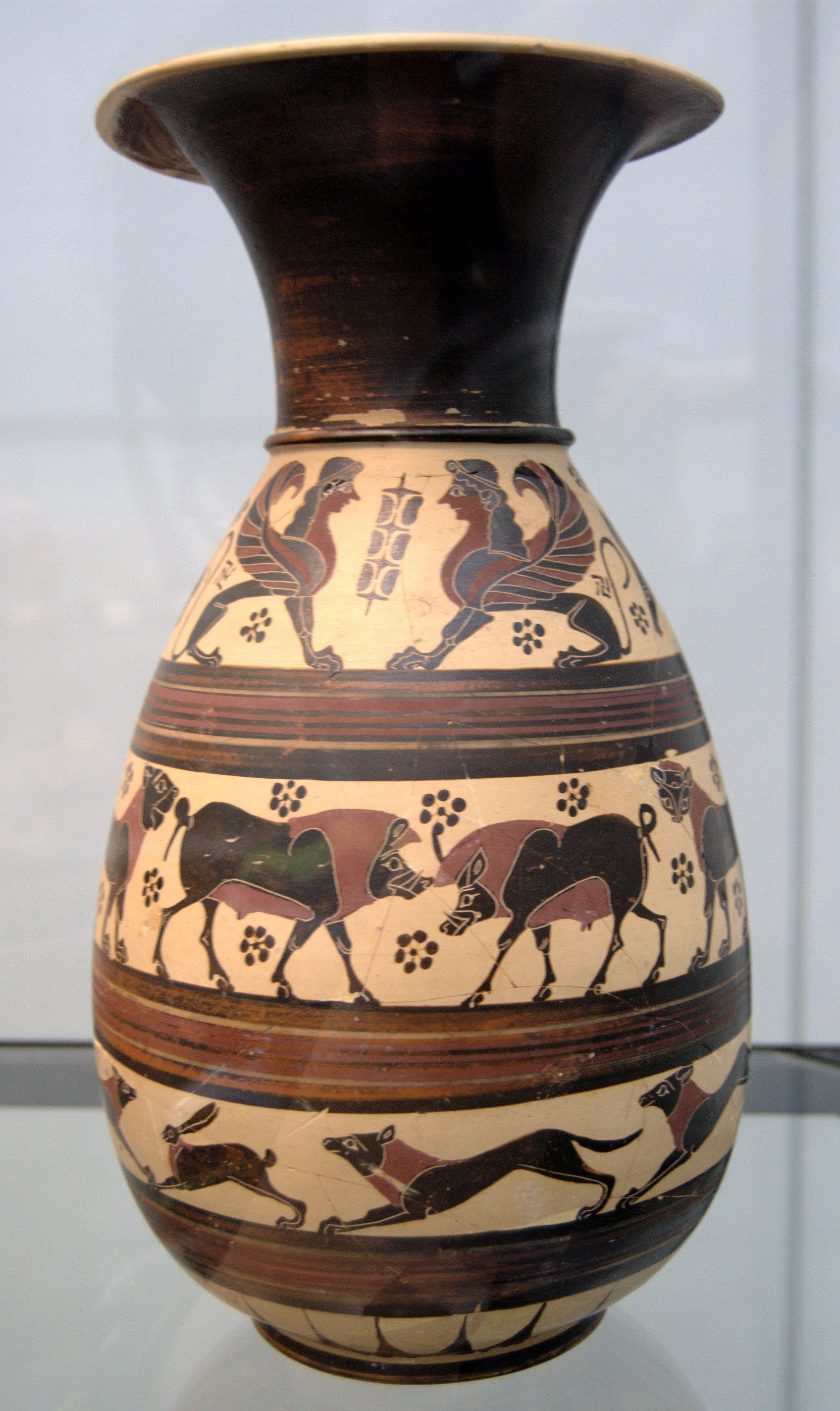
Corinthian orientalising jug, c. 620 BC, Antikensammlungen Munich

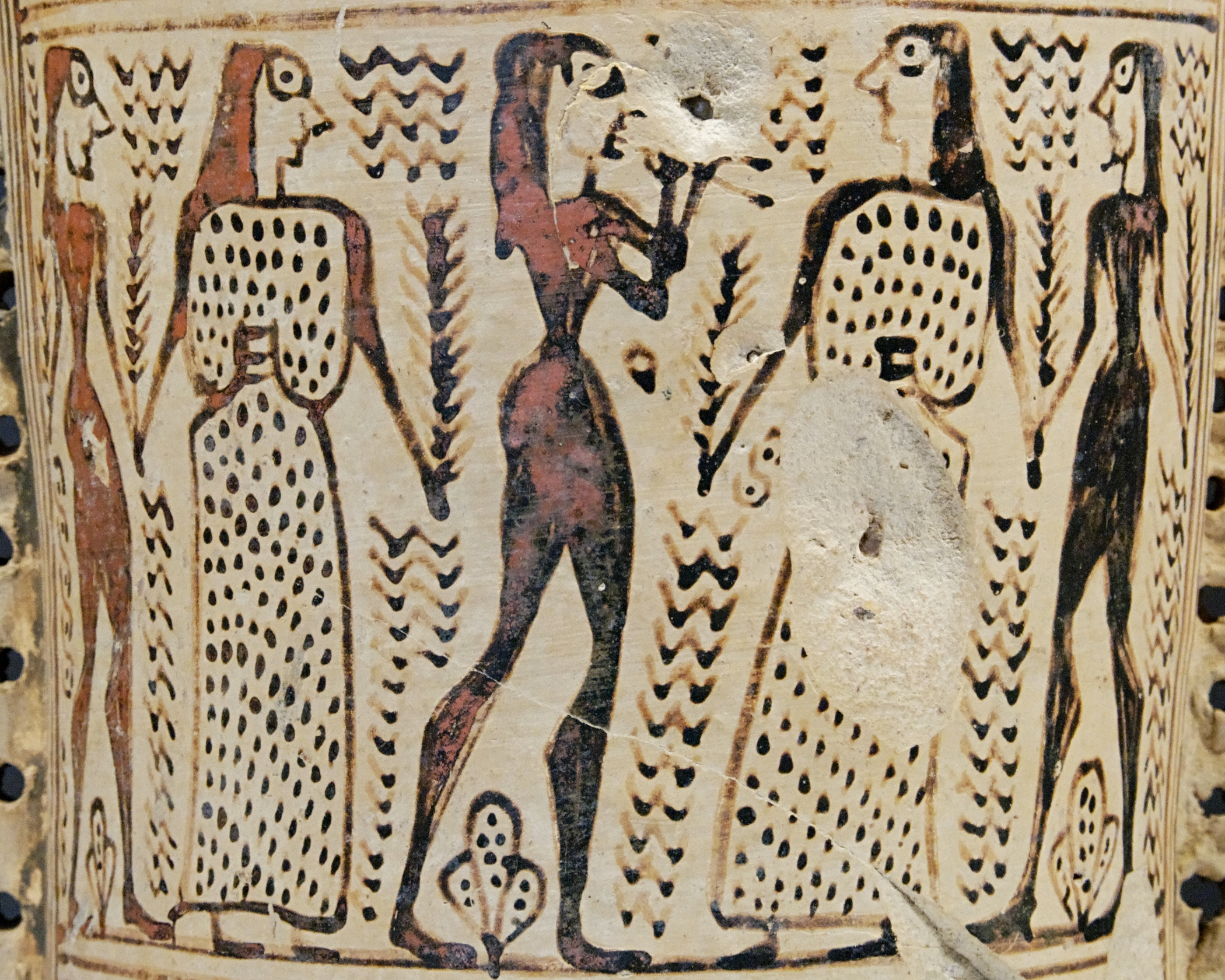
Neck of a Proto-Attic loutrophoros by the Analatos Painter.

The Orientalizing period or Orientalizing revolution is an art historical period that began during the later part of the 8th century BC, when art of the Eastern Mediterranean and the Ancient Near East heavily influenced nearby Mediterranean cultures, most notably Archaic Greece. The main sources were Egypt, Phoenicia, Syria, and Assyria. With the spread of Phoenician civilization by Carthage and Greek colonisation into the Western Mediterranean, these artistic trends also influenced the Etruscans and early Ancient Romans in the Italian Peninsula.

== Style and influences ==
During this period there arose in ancient Greek art ornamental motifs and an interest in animals and monsters that continued to be depicted for centuries, and that also spread to Roman and Etruscan art. Monumental and figurative sculpture in this style may be called Daedalic, after Daedalus, who was according to legend the founder of Greek sculpture. The period is characterized by a shift from the prevailing Geometric style to a style with Eastern-inspired motifs. This new style reflected a period of increased cultural interchange in the Aegean world, the intensity of which is sometimes compared to that of the Late Bronze Age.

The emergence of Orientalizing motifs in Greek pottery is clearly evident at the end of the Late Geometric Period, although two schools of thought exist regarding the question of whether or not Geometric art itself was indebted to eastern models. In Attic pottery, the distinctive Orientalizing style known as "proto-Attic" was marked by floral and animal motifs; it was the first time discernibly Greek religious and mythological themes were represented in vase painting. The bodies of men and animals were depicted in silhouette, though their heads were drawn in outline; women were drawn completely in outline. At the other important center of this period, Corinth, the orientalizing influence started earlier, though the tendency there was to produce smaller, highly detailed vases in the "proto-Corinthian" style that prefigured the black-figure technique.

From the mid-sixth century, the growth of Achaemenid power in the eastern end of the Aegean and in Asia Minor reduced the quantity of eastern goods found in Greek sites, as the Persians began to conquer Greek cities in Ionia, along the coast of Asia Minor.

== Background ==
During this period, the Assyrians advanced along the Mediterranean coast, accompanied by Greek and Carian mercenaries, who were also active in the armies of Psamtik I in Egypt. The new groups started to compete with established Mediterranean merchants. In other parts of the Aegean world similar population moves occurred. Phoenicians settled in Cyprus and in western regions of Greece, while Greeks established trading colonies at Al Mina, Syria, and in Ischia (Pithecusae) off the Tyrrhenian coast of Campania in southern Italy. These interchanges led to a period of intensive borrowing in which the Greeks (especially) adapted cultural features from the East into their art.

The period from roughly 750 to 580 BC also saw a comparable Orientalizing phase of Etruscan art, as a rising economy encouraged Etruscan families to acquire foreign luxury products incorporating Eastern-derived motifs. Similarly, areas of Italy—such as Magna Grecia, Sicily, the Picenum, Latium vetus, Ager Faliscus, the Venetic region, and the Nuragic civilization in Sardinia—also experienced an Orientalizing phase at this time. There is also an Orientalizing period in the Iberian Peninsula, in particular in the city-state of Tartessos.

== Orientalizing ==
Massive imports of raw materials, including metals, and a new mobility among foreign craftsmen caused new craft skills to be introduced in Greece. Walter Burkert described the new movement in Greek art as a revolution: "With bronze reliefs, textiles, seals, and other products, a whole world of eastern images was opened up which the Greeks were only too eager to adopt and adapt in the course of an 'orientalizing revolution'".

Among surviving artefacts, the main effects are seen in painted pottery and metalwork, as well as engraved gems. Monumental and figurative sculpture was less affected, and there the new style is often called Daedalic. A new type of face is seen, especially on Crete, with "heavy, overlarge features in a U- or V-shaped face with horizontal brow"; these derive from the Near East. The greatest number of examples are from pottery found at sites. There were three types of new motifs: animal, vegetable, and abstract. Much of the vegetable repertoire tended to be highly stylised. Vegetable motifs such as the palmette, lotus and tendril volute were characteristic of Greek decoration, and through the Greek culture these were transmitted to most of Eurasia. Exotic animals and monsters, in particular the lion (no longer native to Greece by this period) and sphinxes were added to the griffin, as found at Knossos.

In bronze and terracotta figurines, the introduction from the east of the mould led to a great increase in production of figures mainly made as votive offerings.

Cultural predominance of the East, identified archaeologically by pottery, ivory and metalwork of eastern origin found in Hellenic sites, soon gave way to thorough Hellenization of imported features in the Archaic Period that followed.

== Effect on myth and literature ==
The inscription from Osteria dell'Osa.

Many Greek myths originated in attempts to interpret and integrate foreign icons in terms of Greek cult and practice. Some Greek myths reflect Mesopotamian literary classics. Walter Burkert has argued that it was migrating seers and healers who transmitted their skills in divination and purification ritual along with elements of their mythological wisdom. M. L. West also has documented massive overlaps in early Greek mythological themes and Near Eastern literature, and the influences extend to considerable lexical flows from Semitic languages into early Greek. This overlap also covers a notable range of topical and thematic parallels between Greek epic and the Tanakh.

The intense encounter during the orientalizing period also accompanied the invention of the Greek alphabet and the Carian alphabet, based on the earlier Levantine writing, which caused a spectacular leap in literacy and literary production, as the oral traditions of the epic began to be transcribed onto imported Egyptian papyrus (and occasionally leather).

It is likely that the earliest writing systems in Italy developed from the Etruscan script. However, one of the earliest pieces of writing in Italy that dates to the Orientalizing period possibly contains text in a Euboean script. The writing was inscribed by a metal point onto a globular flask in a double burial from Osteria dell'Osa. It is unclear precisely what the text reads, although it is most often interpreted as containing the letters "ΕΥΛΙΝ" ("Eulin"). Further interpretation of the text is likewise unclear, although it may have been a noun or name related to the Ancient Greek term "εὔλινος" ("eúlinos", "spinning well"), a word that may have been chosen to connect to the weaving themes within the female burials of the Latial culture. The term is otherwise interpreted as the Latin phrase "ni lue" ("do not untie [me]") or the Greek term "εὐοῖ" ("euoî"), a chant used in the cult of Dionysus.

== See also ==
- Daidala
- Kore (sculpture)
- Kouros
