= Berlin Goddess =

Greek kore statue (6th-century BC)

Berlin Goddess (Berlin Kore)
- Berliner Göttin
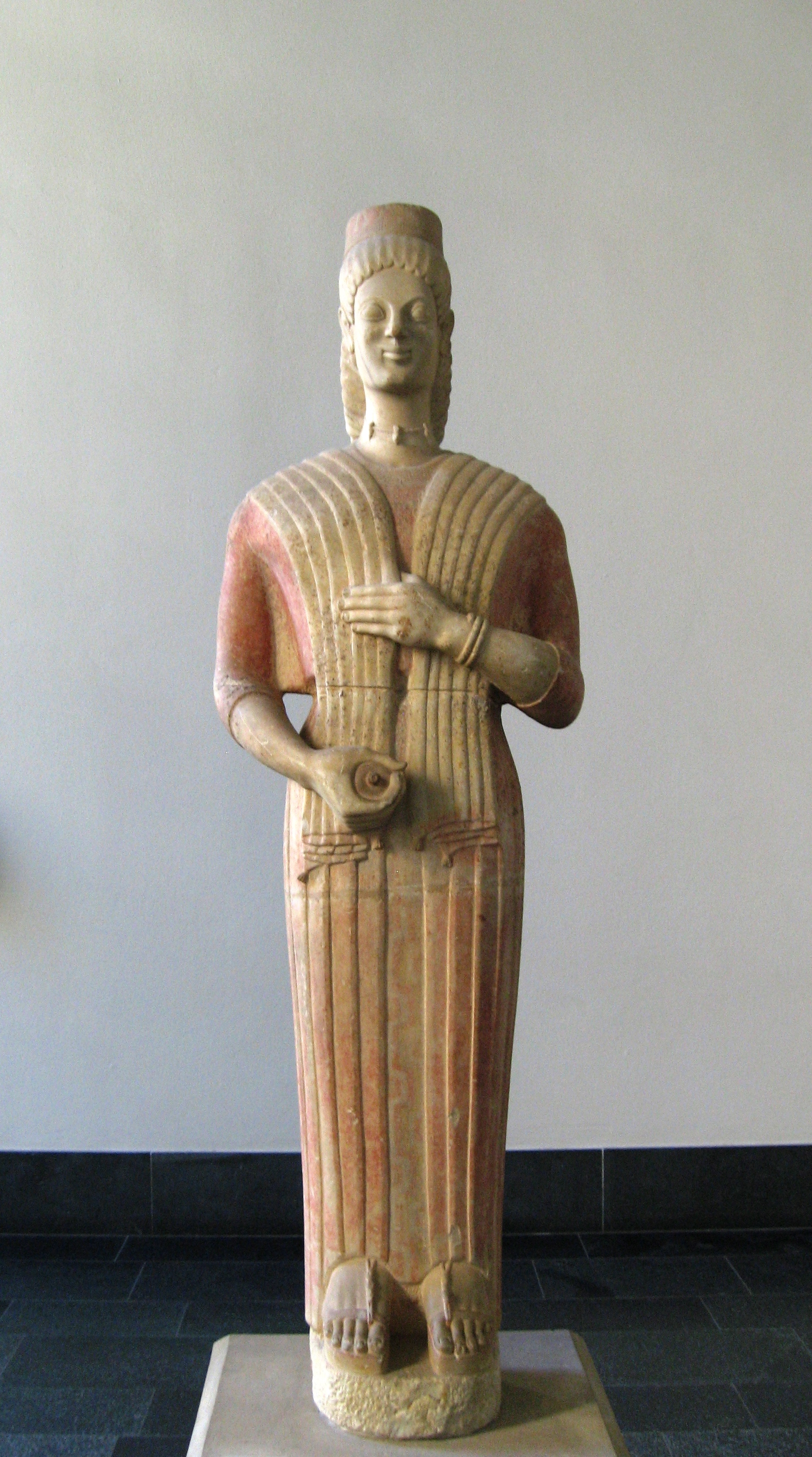
- Material: Marble
- Height: 1.93 m
- Created: 570 BC
- Period/culture: High Archaic
- Discovered: 1923; Keratea
- Present location: Altes Museum, Antikensammlung Berlin, Germany
- Identification: SK 1800
- Culture: Archaic Greece

The Berlin Goddess, or Berlin Kore is an Archaic Greek kore made in 570 B.C. discovered in the city of Keratea, which was a part of Attica, Greece. Discovered in 1923 in a complete state, it has since then placed on display at the Antikensammlung Berlin.

It is considered another major example of ancient Greek sculpture that maintains much of its polychromy, with traces of its original red, yellow, and blue pigments present.

== Discovery ==
The kore was discovered approximately 1923, in the town of Olympos, part of present-day Keratea. It was allegedly covered with lead when it was found in situ. Subsequently, it entered the art market, where it was held by archaeologist Theodor Wiegand. The kore was once examined and offered to John Marshall in 1925, an antiquities art dealer who actively was expanding the Greek and Roman galleries of the Museum of Fine Arts, Boston and Metropolitan Museum of Art, but was ultimately turned down. It was acquired by the Antikensammlung Berlin in 1924–1925, per the museum archives, where it was displayed in the Altes Museum and the Pergamon Museum throughout its exhibition.

During World War II, the kore was removed from exhibit for air raid protections, and subsequently during the Fall of Berlin on May 1, 1945, the kore was confiscated by Soviet authorities, wherein it was displayed at the Hermitage Museum as both a "war trophy", and a "Treasure of World Culture Saved by the Soviet Union" where it was exhibited in St. Petersburg and Moscow. Upon the tenth anniversary of the establishment of East Germany, the sculpture was repatriated, and was put on display at the Pergamon. It was on special exhibit in Tokyo and Kyoto in 1973.

In 2009, the kore underwent conservation treatment, and was subsequently returned to its original location at the Altes Museum, in its own display case rather than standing freely. It is designated in the museum as SK 1800.

== Description ==
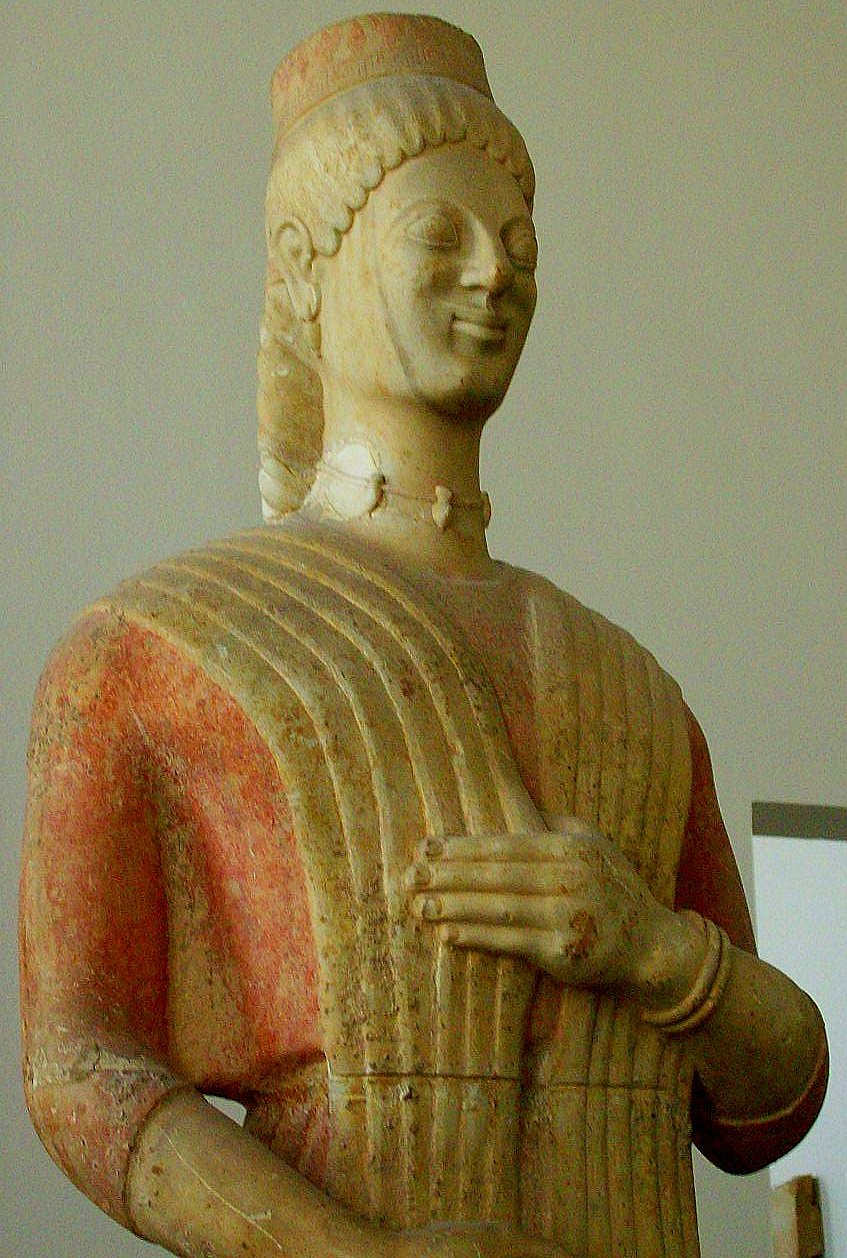
Traces of pigment present on the Berlin Goddess

The kore depicts a woman standing stoically, wearing an epiblema, a rectangular shawl over a belted peplos. Standing in frontal pose, with arms bent, she holds a pomegranate on her right hand by her right hip, which is known for its funerary associations.

The sculpture maintains its polychromy, with presence of red and blue pigments on the garments, it is also noted that the Berlin goddess is blonde with yellow pigment noted in the hair.

The hair is braided in the form of scalloped waves, and tied behind the ears as a double-fillet below the neck. She wears a polos decorated with lotus buds, associated with fertility goddesses. She is adorned with a necklace, matching earrings, bud-like pendants, and a spiral bracelet on her left wrist.

It is likely that the Berlin Goddess is a memorial statue, in comparison to that of the Merenda Kouros and Phrasikleia Kore, though the Berlin Goddess lacks a memorial description on its plinth the way Phrasikleia has.

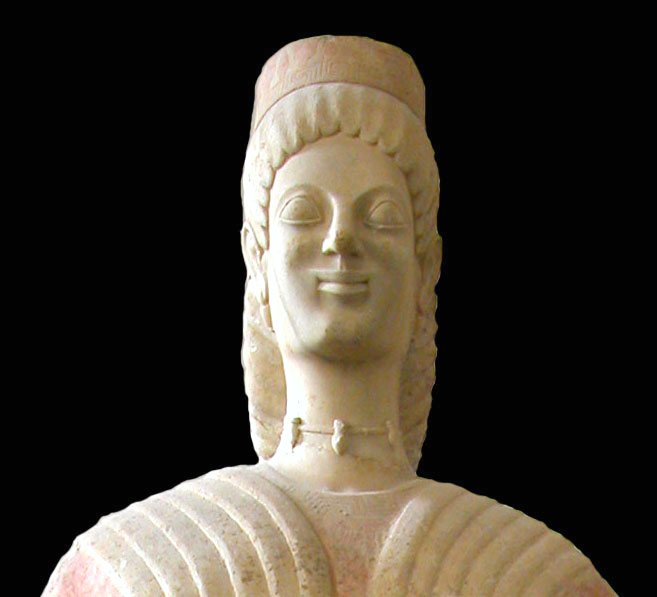
Frontal

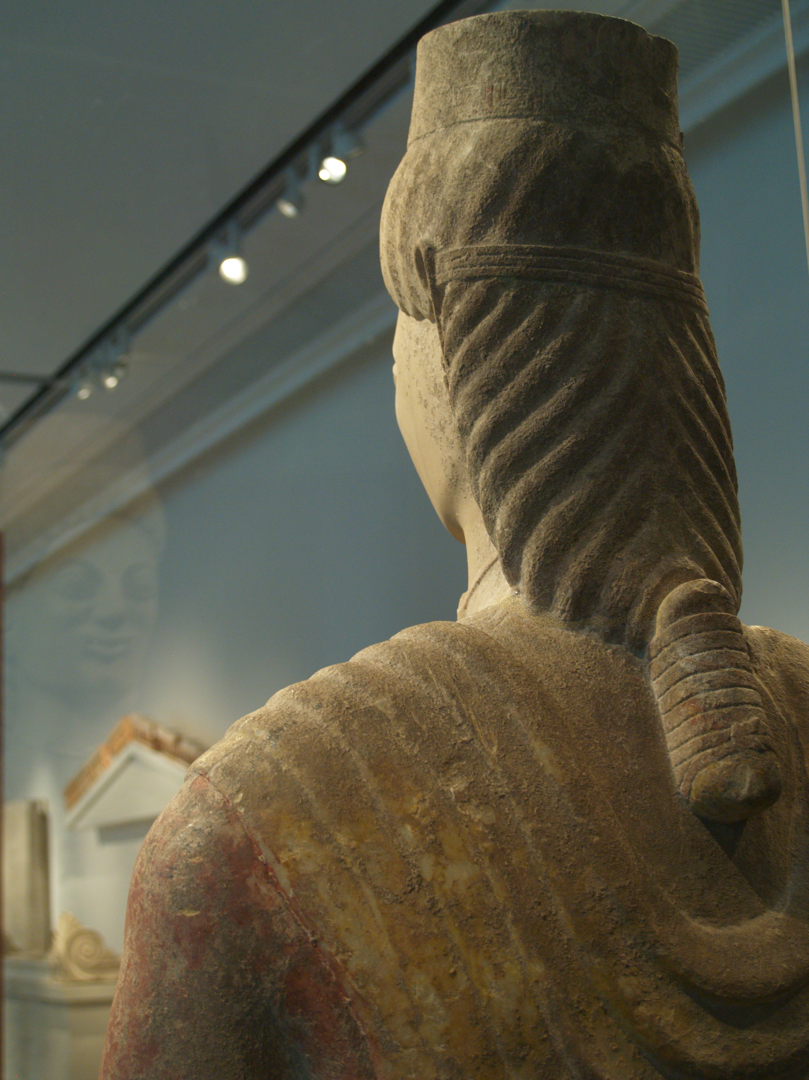
View from behind

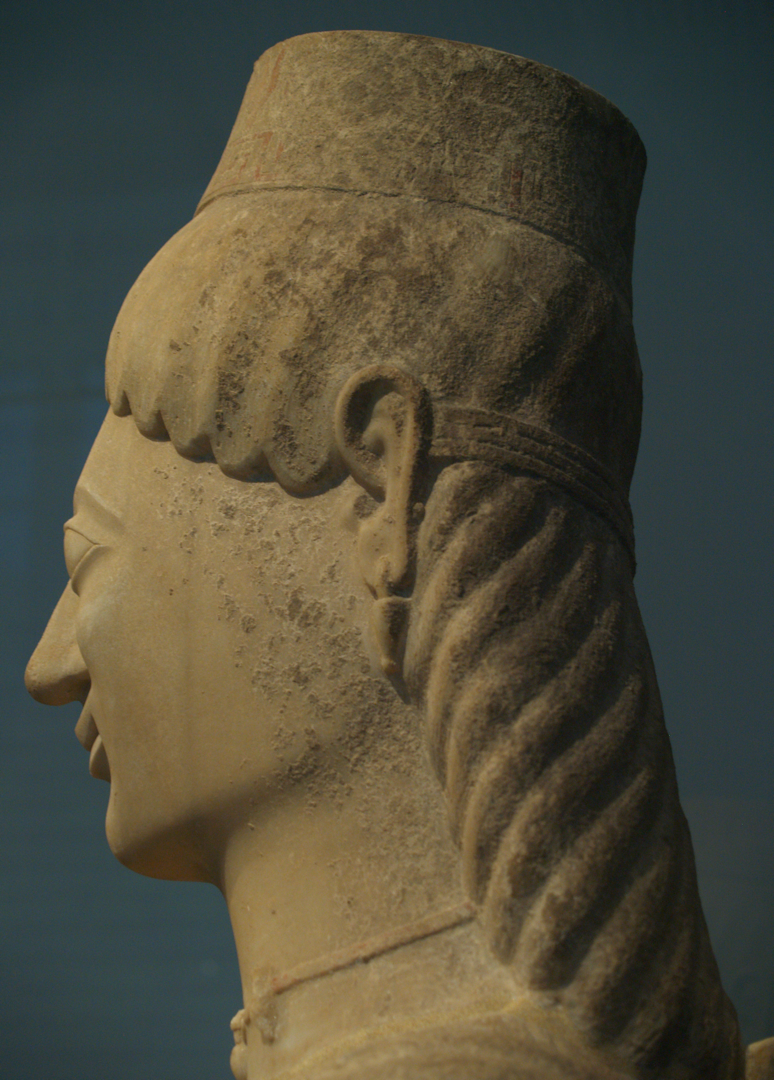
Side profile

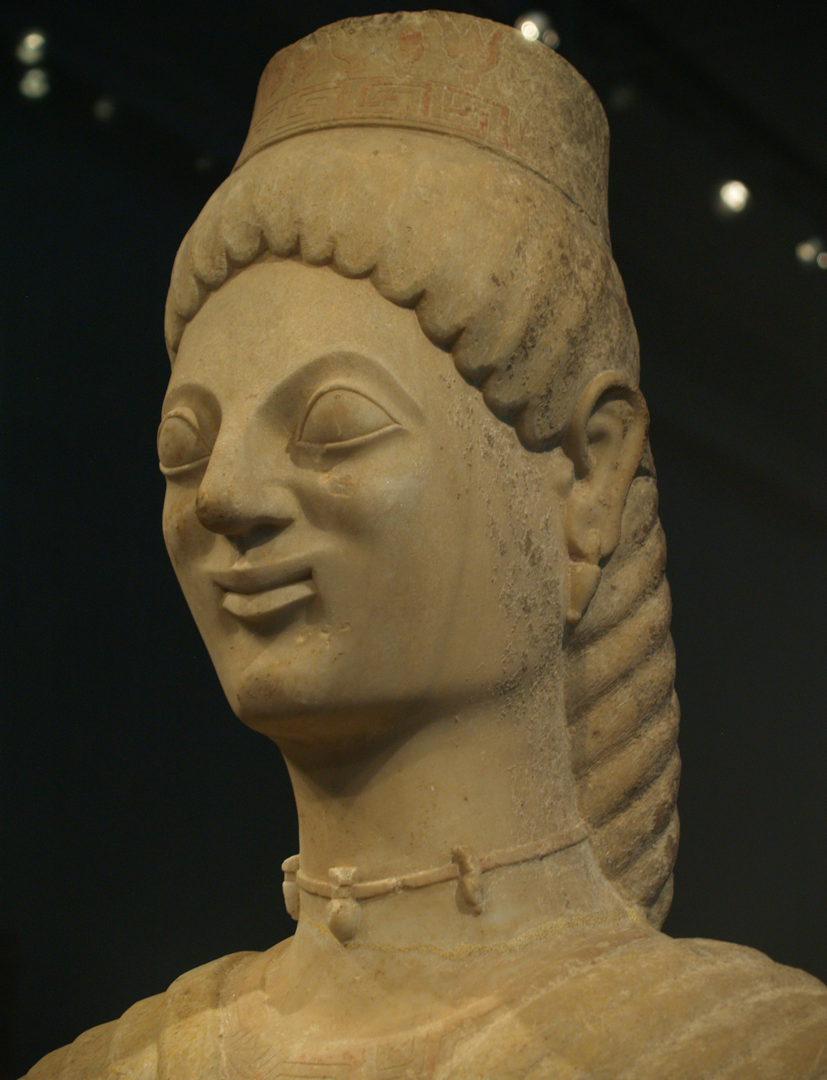
Details of the head and hair, half-frontal angle

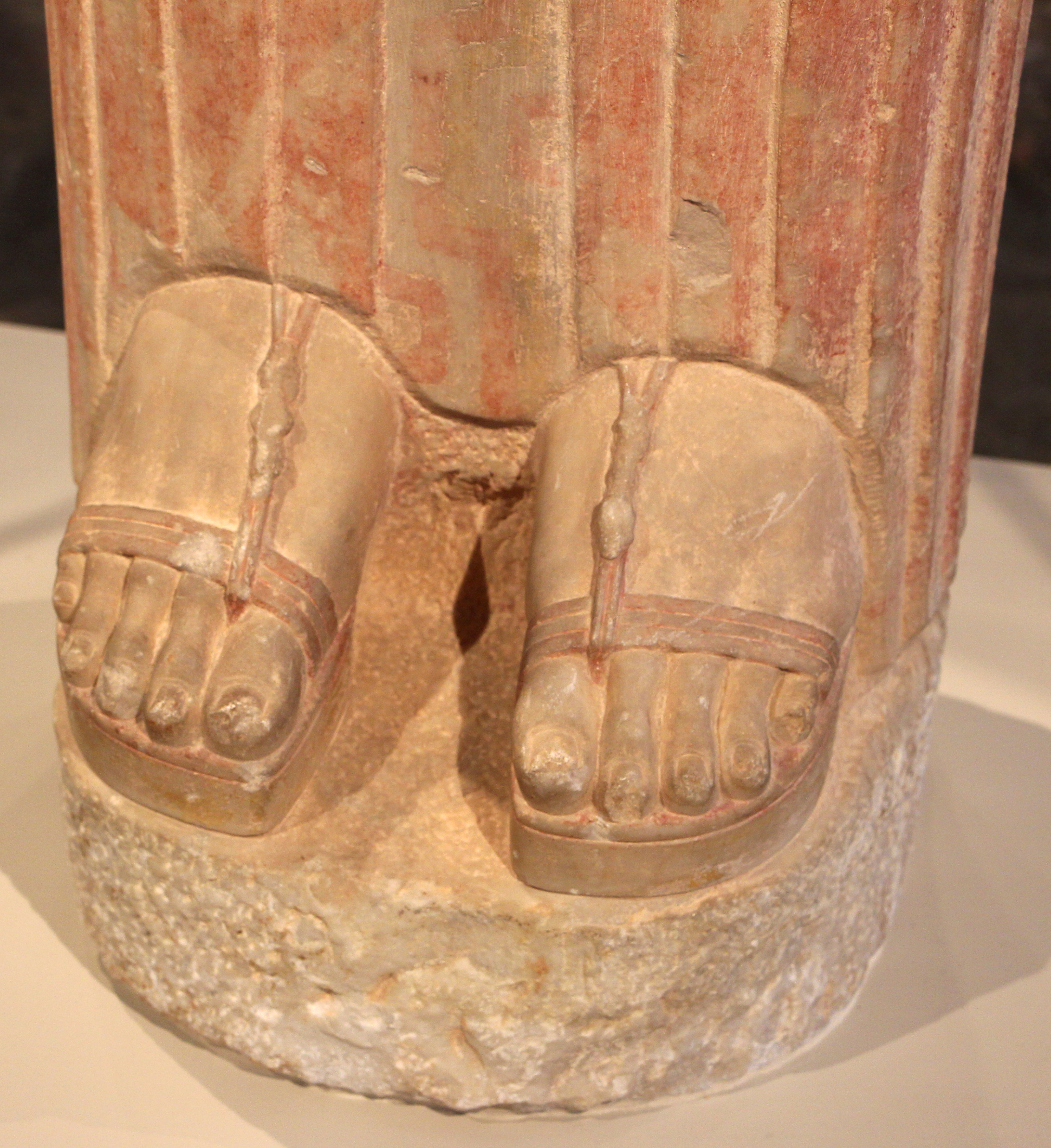
Sandals

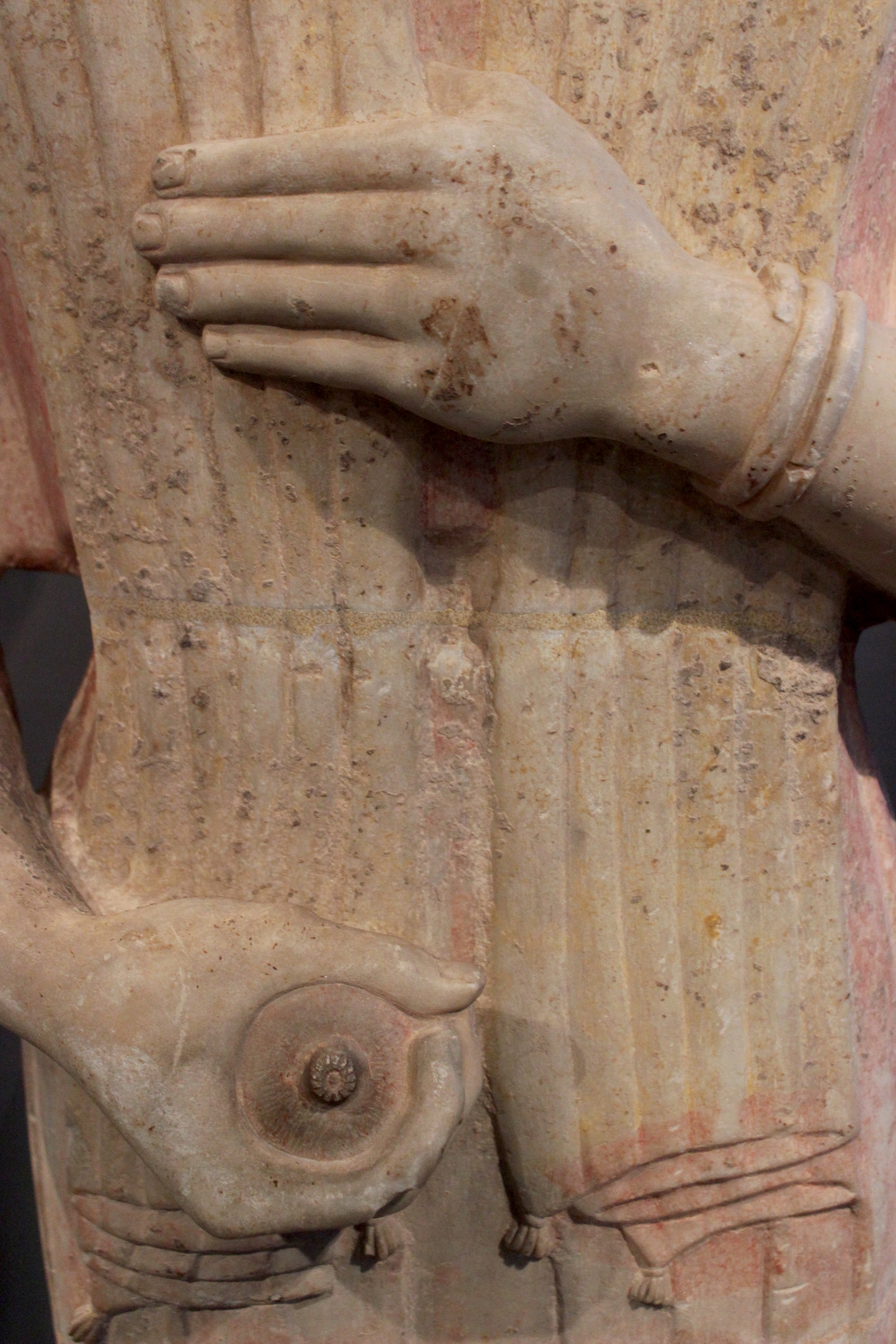
The pomegranate
