= Daidala =

Type of sculpture attributed to the legendary Greek artist, Daedalus

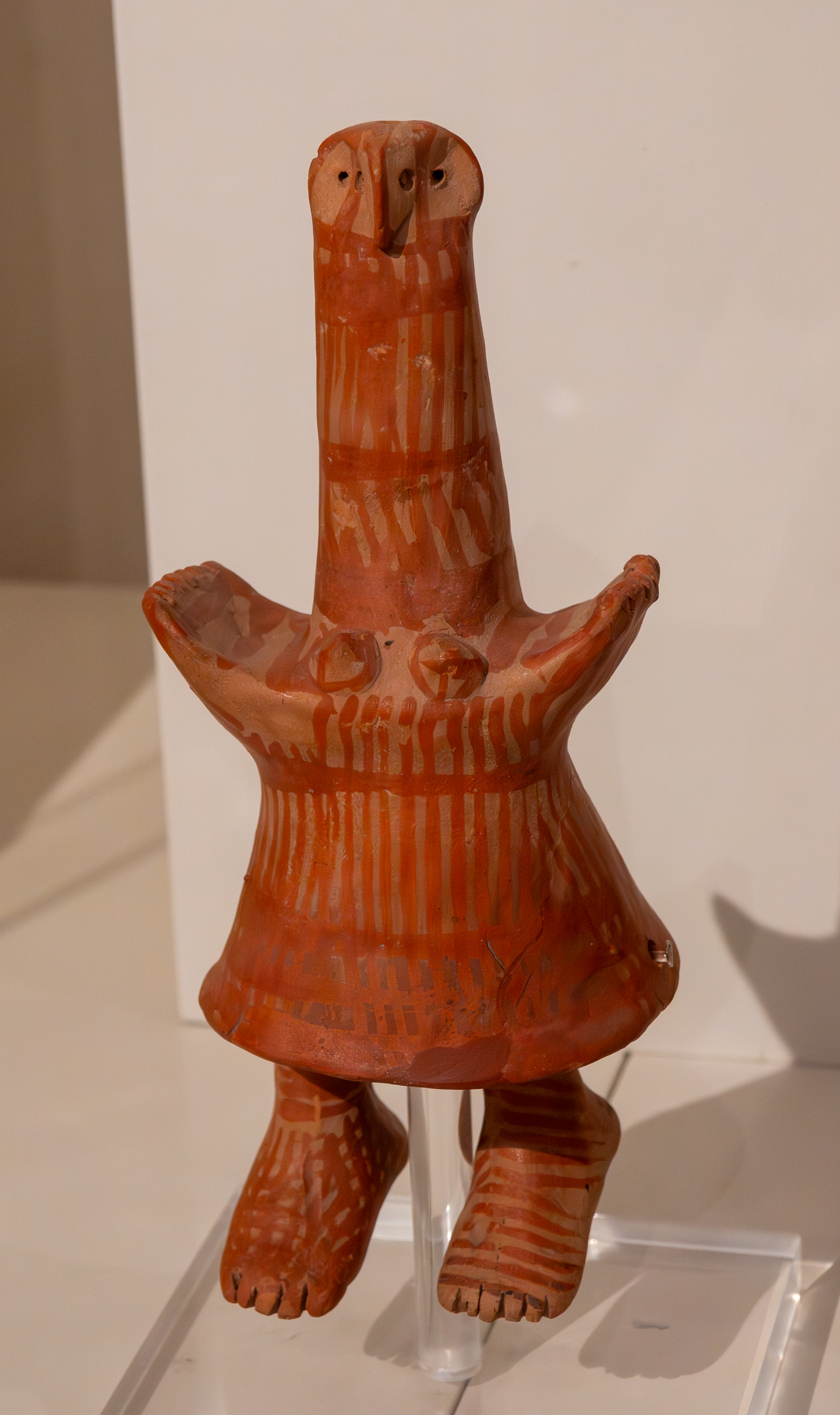
An archaic ceramic daidala of Athena Glaukopis ("owl-faced" Athena), used as the mascot for the 2004 Olympic Games (National Archaeological Museum, Athens)

The daidala (Greek: δαίδαλα) is a type of sculpture attributed to the legendary Greek artist Daedalus, who is connected in legend both to Bronze Age Crete and to the earliest period of Archaic sculpture in Bronze Age Greece. The legends about Daedalus recognize him both as a man and as a mythical embodiment.

== History ==
Daedalus was credited as the reputed inventor of agalmata, statues of the gods which had open eyes and moveable limbs. These statues were so lifelike that Plato remarked upon their amazing and disconcerting mobility, which was accomplished with techniques that are clearly those of the "daidala". The writer Pausanias thought that wooden images were referred to as "daidala" even before Daedalus’s time. The name "Daedalus", more specifically, has been suggested by Alberto Pérez-Gómez to be a play on the Greek word "daidala" which appears in archaic literature as a complement of the verb "to make", "to manufacture", "to forge", "to weave", "to place on", or "to see". Daidala were the implements of early society: defensive works, arms, furniture, and so forth.

== Description ==
Daedalic sculpture is representative of the Orientalizing period in Greek art. Eastern influences are particularly noticeable in the head seen from the front; it resembles an Eastern head, with wiglike hair, but is more angular, having a triangular face, large eyes, and a prominent nose. Furthermore, the hair usually forms two upward-facing triangles on either side of the face. The female body is rather flatly geometric, with high waist and formless drapery. Early sculpture exhibiting these attributes is known as "Daedalic"; it was used for figurines, on clay plaques, and in relief decorations on vases. It seems to have had a marked influence in the Peloponnese, Dorian Crete, and Rhodes. Its style is based on a simple formula which remained dominant, though with evolutionary modifications, for about two generations, before evolving into the Archaic style.
