= Kore (sculpture) =

Ancient Greek statue of a young woman from the Archaic period

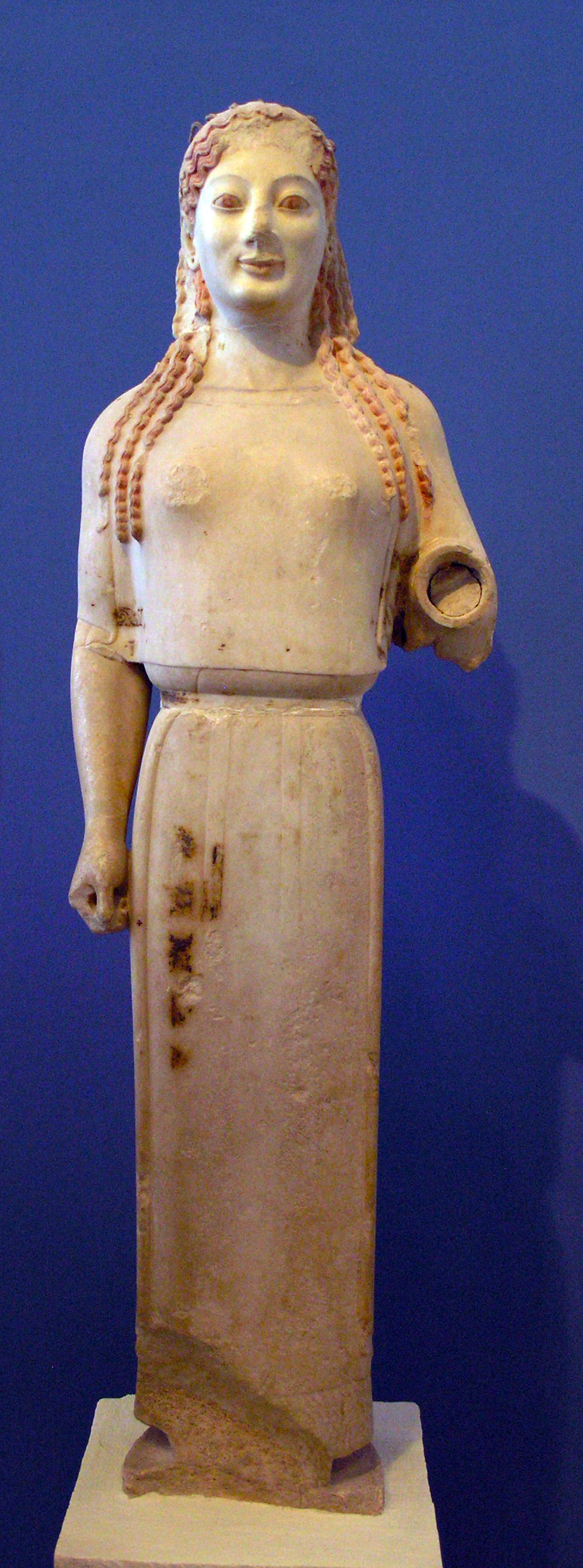
The Peplos Kore, created circa 530 BCE

Kore (Greek: κόρη "maiden"; plural korai) is the modern term given to a type of free-standing ancient Greek sculpture of the Archaic period depicting female figures, always of a young age. Kouroi are the youthful male equivalent of kore statues.

Korai show the restrained "archaic smile", which did not demonstrate emotion. It was the symbol of the ideal, transcending the hardships of the world. Unlike the nude kouroi, korai are depicted in thick and sometimes elaborate drapery. As fashions changed, so did the type of clothing they wore. Over time, korai went from the heavy peplos to lighter garments such as the chiton. Their posture is rigid and column-like, sometimes with an extended arm. Some korai were painted colorfully to enhance the visual impact of the garments and for narrative purposes.

There are multiple theories on whether the korai represent mortals or deities. Korai also functioned as offerings to the deities or the dead.

== History ==
The duration of the Archaic korai lasted between about sixth to fifth century BCE. Similar to the kouroi, historians believe that the korai was influenced by Egyptian convention. Since ancient Greeks and Egyptians had relations with one another, artistic influence was possible. Korai have been found throughout Greece, such as in Athens, Ionia, Cyclades, and Corinth. This demonstrates that korai were not regionally isolated. The largest excavation of korai was at the Acropolis of Athens in the 1880s. They served their purpose as votive offerings to the patron goddess, Athena, on the Acropolis throughout the sixth and early fifth century BCE. However, in 480/479 BCE, invading Persians attacked and desecrated the city of Athens including the Acropolis and many of its statues. After the attack the Athenians buried the korai, whether or not they were broken, in "graveyards" on the Acropolis (see: Perserschutt). It was believed they did this to rid the reminder of the act of barbarianism done by the Persians and allow Athens to rebuild.

== Function ==
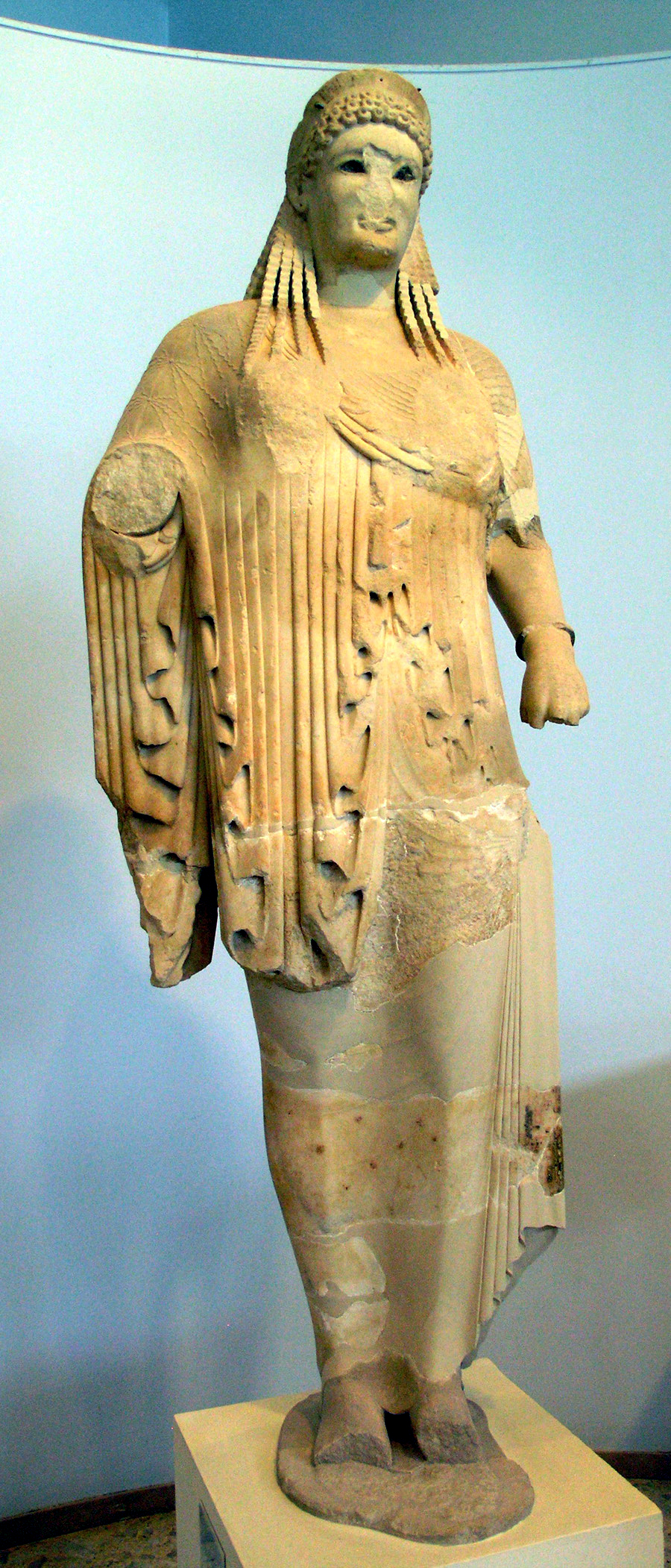
Antenor Kore, circa 530 BCE

The kore statue had two main purposes. Korai were used as votive offerings to deities, mainly goddesses such as Athena and Artemis. Both men and women offered the kore statues. Korai not only acted as an offering to a deity, but could be used to show off economic and social standing within a polis. How elaborate the statue was, varied. Korai demonstrated individual wealth and status because they were fairly expensive to create and limited to the upper class. To indicate their wealth, elite Greeks had their statues decorated in paint and jewels. An example of a kore used as a votive offering is the Antenor Kore that was dedicated by Nearkhos.

Ancient Greeks also used korai for funerary purposes. They were grave markers and offerings for the deceased. It is suggested by historians that the funerary kore portray the appearance of the dead. This became evident with their names being inscribed on the bases of the statues. An example would be the statue of Phrasikleia unearthed from the Meogeia plain in Attica. The statue marked the grave of a young unwed girl according to the inscription found on the base.

Whether korai were given as votive offerings or grave markers, according to historian Robin Osborne, they were allegoric symbols as “tokens of exchange”. Unlike the nude and distant kouroi, korai are completely clothed and engage with their viewer. Their arm is extended and offers gifts of fruit, flowers, and birds. Patrons used korai as offerings to the deities or the dead. Korai symbolize their function by narrating the scene of exchange.

== Theories on identity ==
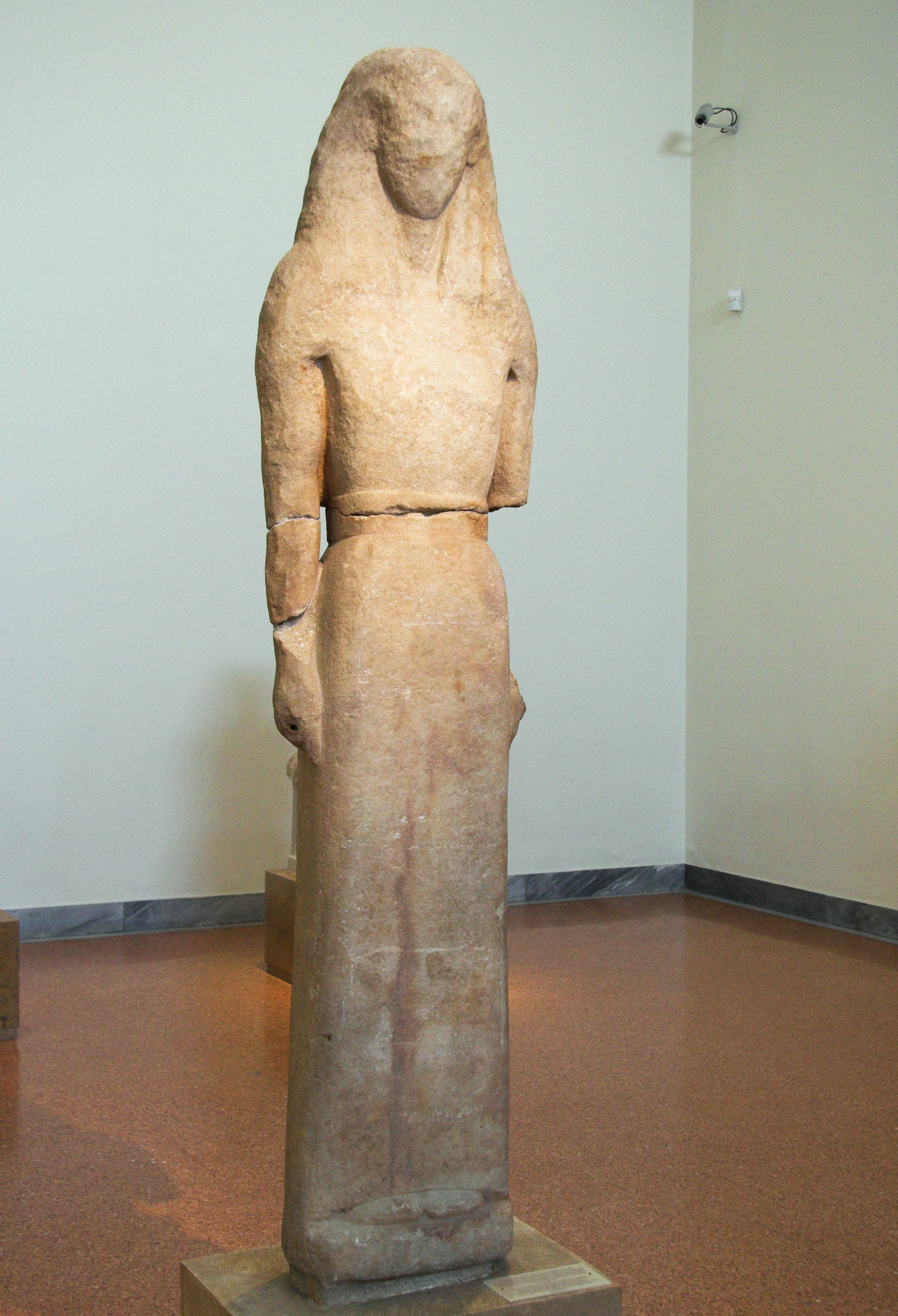
Nikandre Kore, circa 650 BC

Identification has not been an easy task because of time or the lack of context for many korai. It has been difficult for historians and scholars to determine the identities of the korai statues, but they have theories of whom they might be. There are two theories that many historians are in agreement on for identification: the "divinities" theory and "agalmata" theory.

=== Divinities theory ===
The "divinities" theory suggests that the korai represent goddesses, nymphs, and other types of female deities. This theory could only be true for some of the statues. The problem historians have with this theory is that not all of the statues share similar characteristics. If they represented a specific deity, then each kore would share traits to identify them as that particular individual. This became evident about the korai found at the Acropolis in Athens. Not all of the korai could be identified as Athena, the patron goddess, because of their unique characteristics. According to Henri Lechat, in order for all of the korai to be goddesses, they would all be different female deities. That would be more divine beings than Greeks had in their pantheon. However, some of the korai are divine figures, such as the Nikandre Kore as a statue of Artemis.

=== Agalmata theory ===
The agalmata theory proposes that many korai are generic maidens who represent the Archaic ideal of female beauty. Those maidens could be the priestesses, the donor of the statue, or young girls who served the goddess. The agalmata theory accepts that some, but not all of the korai might be goddesses or other female divinities. Art historian Jeffery M. Hurwit suggests that the generic maidens were symbols for ideal beauty that embellished the sanctuaries and pleased the deities. Their presence is meant to be a delightful gift for spectators to gaze upon. The main idea for the patrons was that if the korai were pleasurable to look at, then it would please the deity as well.

== Polychromy ==
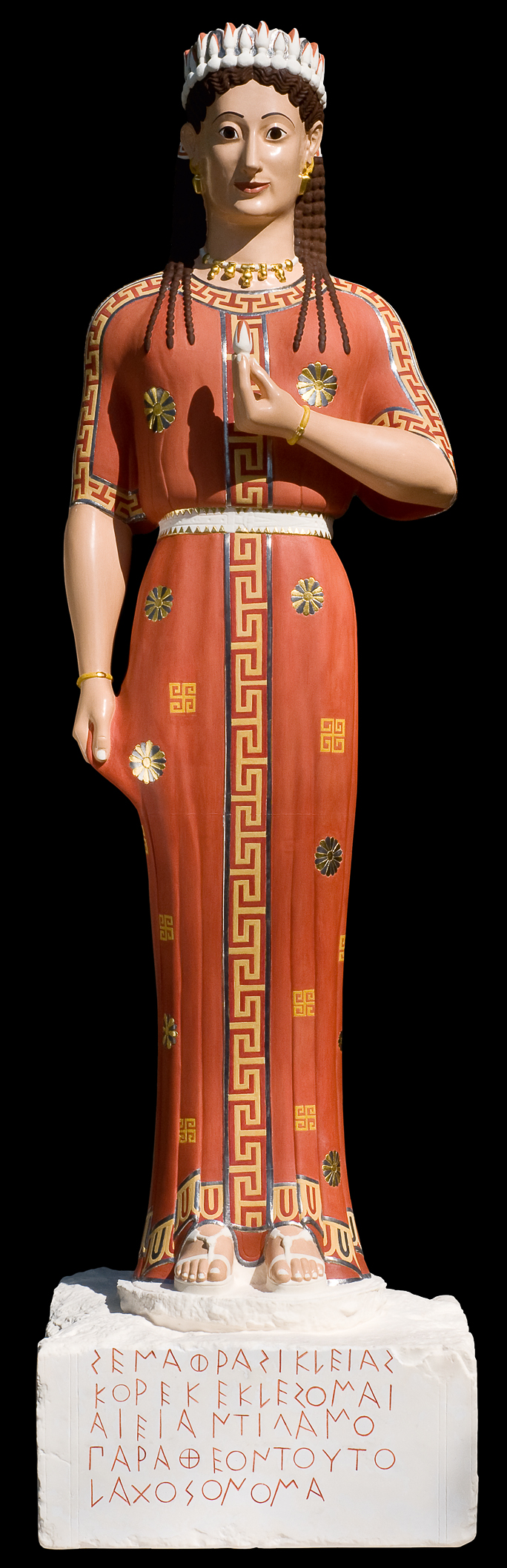
Speculative Reconstruction of the Phrasikleia Kore in polychromy

Originally, many of the korai were polychrome. Greeks used color to depict narrative value, characterize individuals, and create meaning behind korai. Color was used to create patterns on the clothing of the korai. One example of patterning is seen on the Peplos Kore. Historians originally believed that the Peplos Kore was wearing a regular peplos, but in fact she was wearing an ependytes with animal friezes. This type of Oriental prestige garment was usually reserved for goddesses.

Art historians debate whether the Peplos Kore is Artemis or the patron goddess of the Acropolis, Athena. The evidence leans toward the goddess Artemis, but without the true coloring it is difficult to say for sure.

The Phrasikleia Kore is another example of polychromy being an important part of the korai. When the sculptor designed this kore, the marble was incised, creating a light relief of a pattern. This is evident with the rosette and meander patterning in the dress. The technique used was common among sculptors when planning out the coloring of the finished product.

Color was also an indicator of wealth. The more prestigious the use of color indicated a higher social position due to the high cost of dyes. Clothes in bright colors were more expensive. In addition, color was used to depict jewelry or gems graphically on a kore. If the patron was wealthy, the sculptors could use jewelry and metals as aspects of their sculpture.

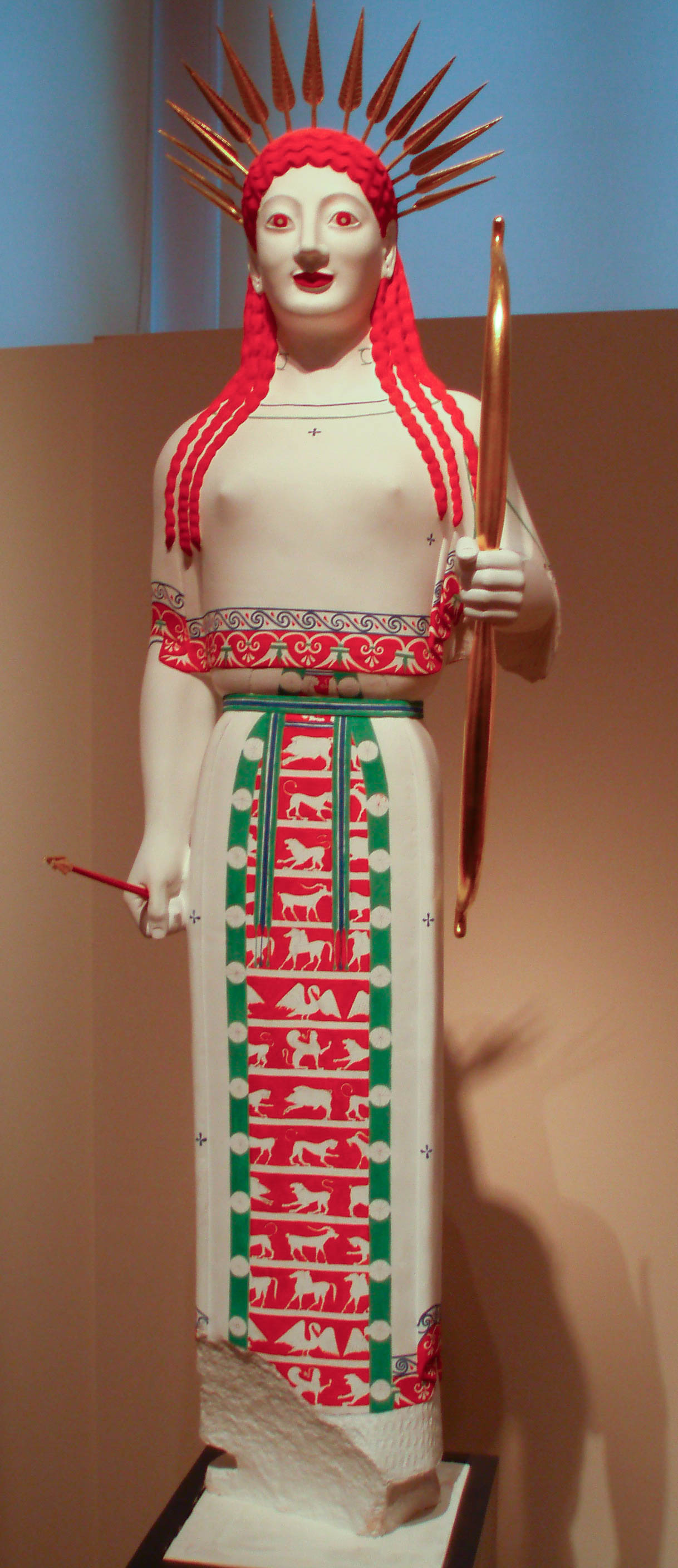
Speculative reconstruction of the Peplos Kore as Artemis in polychromy

There is an aesthetic misconception that the sculptures were pure white marble.

Since the times of Michelangelo, it has been believed that ancient Greek and Roman sculptures were sculpted to be only white marble. This stereotype influenced many viewers of ancient art and created biases. Johann Joachim Winckelmann, who pioneered the study of Greco-Roman art history in 1755, held the belief that color in ancient sculpture was inferior and spoiled the purely white marble. This bias persists into the present day.

Scientists and art historians counter this bias by providing evidence of visible remaining colors through microscopy and pigment analysis, ultraviolet fluorescence and reflection, and raking light. Vinzenz Brinkmann and his colleagues have been working to recreate the possible appearances of ancient sculptures in their original color.

== Examples ==
- Berlin Goddess (570 BC, Keratea) a memorial marker discovered in 1923, which maintained much of its original polychromy.
- Phrasikleia Kore (550–540 BC, Athens) functioned as a grave marker for Phrasikleia. The inscription states that she died at a young age and forever will be a "maiden". The sculptor of this kore was Aristion of Paros.
- Nikandre Kore (650 BC, Naxos) was discovered at the sanctuary of Artemis on Delos. It is one of the earliest known statues to depict women in a life-size scale from the previous Geometric statuettes. The Nikandre Kore was a dedication by Nikandre of Naxos to Artemis.
- Kore of Lyons (540s BC, Athens) is part of the Korai of the Acropolis in Athens. She is an example of the Ionian style, supporting the relationship and influence between Athens and Ionia. Although her function is unclear to historians, the Kore of Lyons may have been a caryatid or a votive offering. There is debate among historians about who the kore is supposed to depict. One theory is that the kore is Aphrodite because she is holding a dove, which is a symbol of the goddess.
- Antenor Kore (530–520 BC, Athens) was named after her sculptor, Antenor, who also created the Tyrannicides. The sculpture was commissioned and dedicated by Nearchos to Athenian Acropolis. Historians believe that she may be a representation of a goddess.
- Peplos Kore (530–520 BC, Athens) received her name from the type of clothing she is wearing. It is strongly believed by historians that this kore is a goddess. However, it has been difficult to identify whether she is Athena or Artemis.
