= Classical Athens =

City-state in ancient Greece

Coordinates: 37.97°N 23.72°E

Athens Ἀθῆναι (Ancient Greek)
- 508 BC–322 BC
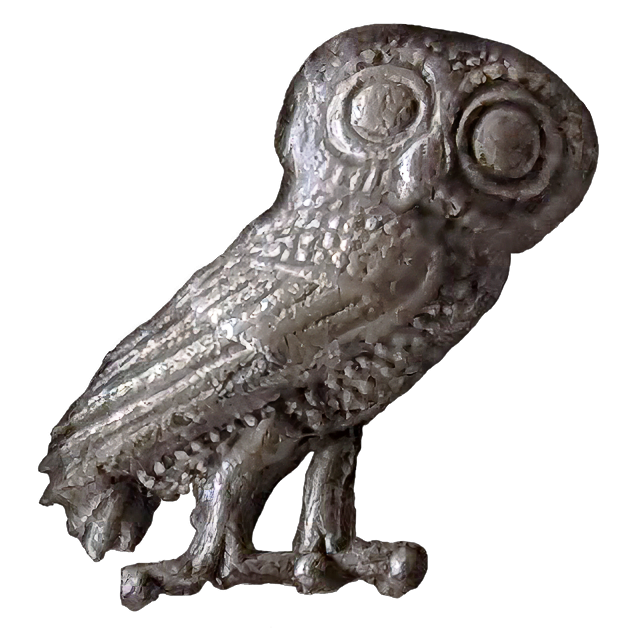
- Owl of Athena, patron of Athens

- Delian League, also known as Athenian Empire, shown in yellow, Athenian territory shown in red, situation in 431 BC, before the Peloponnesian War.
- Capital: Athens
- Common languages: Attic Greek
- Religion: Greek Polytheism
- Government: Athenian democracy
- Eponymous archon
  - 508–507 BC: Cleisthenes
  - 322–321 BC: Philocles
- Legislature: Boule; Ecclesia
- Historical era: Classical antiquity Classical Greece
  - Cleisthenes establishes Athenian democracy: 508 BC
  - Ionian Revolt: 499–493 BC
  - Battle of Marathon: 490 BC
  - Battle of Salamis: 480 BC
  - Delian League: 478–404 BC
  - Peloponnesian War: 431–404 BC
  - Second Athenian League: 378–355 BC
  - League of Corinth: 338–323 BC
  - Lamian War: 322 BC

Population
  - 5th century BC^{1}: ~250,000 (men with civil rights: ~30,000)
- Currency: Drachma
Preceded by	Succeeded by
Peisistratids	Hellenistic Athens
- ^{1}BBC History

Athens (Ancient Greek: Ἀθῆναι, Athênai) was a prominent polis (city-state) of ancient Greece, located in the peninsula of Attica. Athenian democracy was established in 508 BC and remained in place for almost two centuries except for a few brief interruptions. During the Classical period, Athens was a centre for the arts, learning, and philosophy, and is widely referred to as a cradle of Western civilization largely due to the impact of its cultural and political achievements.

Ten years after its victory at Marathon, Athens formed an alliance with Sparta and other Greek city-states, which defeated the invading Achaemenid Empire at Salamis and Plataea. In the aftermath of the Second Persian invasion of Greece during the 470s, Athens led by Cimon established hegemony over a wide range of other Greek polities around the Aegean, known as the Delian League, reaching its peak of power in the 450s and 440s BC during the age of Pericles. In the Peloponnesian War (431–404 BC), the Athenian empire fought against the Spartan-led Peloponnesian League, suffering a decisive defeat in 404 BC. Athens soon recovered and founded the Second Athenian League in order to counterbalance the Spartan and Theban hegemonies. After the defeat at the battle of Chaeronea, Athens was forced to become a member of the League of Corinth by Philip II of Macedon, while continuing to be a major maritime power in the Aegean and Eastern Mediterranean up until the start of the Hellenistic period following the death of Alexander the Great.

== History ==
=== Earlier History and Archaic period ===
The earliest evidence for human habitation in Athens dates back to the Neolithic period. The Acropolis served as a fortified center during the Mycenaean era. Theseus is considered the mythical founder of Athens.

By the 8th century BC, Athens had evolved into a prominent city-state, or polis. The 7th and 6th centuries BC saw the establishment of legal codes, such as those by Draco and Solon, as well as the rule of tyrant Peisistratus.

=== Athenian democracy ===
Hippias, son of Peisistratus, had ruled Athens jointly with his brother, Hipparchus, from the death of Peisistratus in about 527. Following the assassination of Hipparchus in about 514, Hippias took on sole rule, and in response to the loss of his brother, became a worse leader who was increasingly disliked. Hippias exiled 700 of the Athenian noble families, amongst them Cleisthenes's family, the Alchmaeonids. Upon their exile, they went to Delphi, and Herodotus says they bribed the Pythia always to tell visiting Spartans that they should invade Attica and overthrow Hippias. That supposedly worked after a number of times, and Cleomenes I led a Spartan force to overthrow Hippias, which succeeded, and instated an oligarchy. Cleisthenes disliked the Spartan rule, along with many other Athenians, and so made his own bid for power. The result was democracy in Athens, but considering Cleisthenes's motivation for using the people to gain power, as without their support, he would have been defeated, and so Athenian democracy may be tainted by the fact its creation served greatly the man who created it. The reforms of Cleisthenes replaced the traditional four Ionic "tribes" (phyle) with ten new ones, named after legendary heroes of Greece and having no class basis, which acted as electorates. Each tribe was in turn divided into three trittyes (one from the coast; one from the city and one from the inland divisions), while each trittys had one or more demes, depending on their population, which became the basis of local government.

The tribes each selected fifty members by lot for the Boule, the council that governed Athens on a day-to-day basis. The public opinion of voters could be influenced by the political satires written by the comic poets and performed in the city theaters. The Assembly or Ecclesia was open to all full citizens and was both a legislature and a supreme court, except in murder cases and religious matters, which became the only remaining functions of the Areopagus. Most offices were filled by lot, although the ten strategoi (generals) were elected.

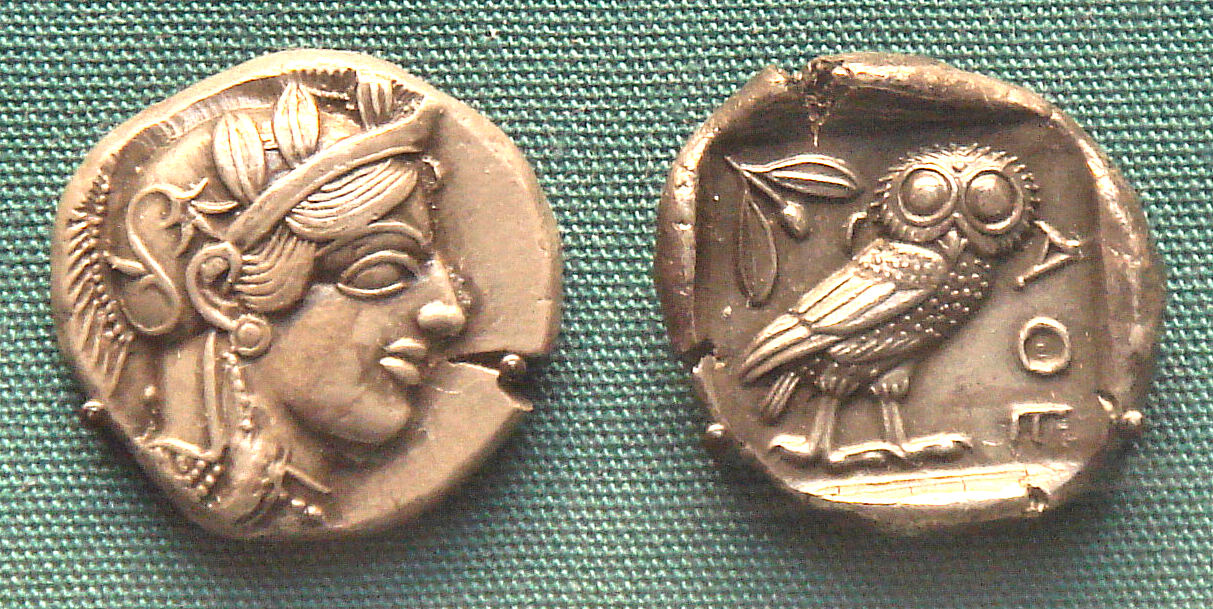
Early Athenian coin, 5th century BC. British Museum

The silver mines of Laurion contributed significantly to the development of Athens in the 5th century BC, when the Athenians learned to prospect, treat, and refine the ore and used the proceeds to build a massive fleet, at the instigation of Themistocles.

=== Classical period ===
==== Persian Wars and rise of Athens ====
In 499 BC, Athens sent troops to aid the Ionian Greeks of Asia Minor who were rebelling against the Persian Empire. This provoked two Persian invasions of Greece, both of which were repelled under the leadership of the soldier-statesmen Miltiades and Themistocles. In 490 the Athenians, led by Miltiades, prevented the first invasion of the Persians, guided by king Darius I, with their victory at the Battle of Marathon.

In 480 the Persians returned under a new ruler, Xerxes I. The Hellenic League led by the Spartan King Leonidas led 7,000 men to hold the narrow passageway of Thermopylae against the 100,000–250,000 army of Xerxes, during which Leonidas and 300 other Spartan elites were killed. Simultaneously the Athenians led an indecisive naval battle off Artemisium. However, that delaying action was not enough to discourage the Persian advance, which soon marched through Boeotia, setting up Thebes as their base of operations, and entered southern Greece. That forced the Athenians to evacuate Athens, which was taken by the Persians, and seek the protection of their fleet. Subsequently, the Athenians and their allies, led by Themistocles, defeated the Persian navy at sea in the Battle of Salamis. Xerxes had built himself a throne on the coast in order to see the Greeks defeated. Instead, the Persians were routed.

==== Athenian hegemony ====
Sparta's hegemony was passing to Athens, and it was Athens that took the war to Thrace and Asia Minor. The victories of Cimon enabled Athens to bring most of the Aegean and many other parts of Greece together in the Delian League, an Athenian-dominated alliance.

Pericles – an Athenian general, politician and well known figure – distinguished himself above the other personalities of the era, men who excelled in politics, philosophy, architecture, sculpture, history and literature. He fostered arts and literature and gave to Athens a splendor which would never return throughout its history. He executed a large number of public works projects and improved the life of the citizens. Hence, this period is often referred to as "Age of Pericles." Silver mined in Laurium in southeastern Attica contributed greatly to the prosperity of this Athenian Golden Age.

During the time of the ascendancy of Ephialtes as leader of the democratic faction, Pericles was his deputy. When Ephialtes was assassinated by personal enemies, Pericles stepped in and was elected general, or strategos, in 445 BC; a post he held continuously until his death in 429 BC, always by election of the Athenian Assembly. The Parthenon, a lavishly decorated temple to the goddess Athena, was constructed under the administration of Pericles.

==== Peloponnesian War (431–404 BC) ====
Resentment by other cities at the hegemony of Athens led to the Peloponnesian War in 431, which pitted Athens and her increasingly rebellious sea empire against a coalition of land-based states led by Sparta. The conflict marked the end of Athenian command of the sea. The war between Athens and the city-state Sparta ended with an Athenian defeat after Sparta started its own navy.

Athenian democracy was briefly overthrown by the coup of 411, brought about because of its poor handling of the war, but it was quickly restored. The war ended with the complete defeat of Athens in 404. Since the defeat was largely blamed on democratic politicians such as Cleon and Cleophon, there was a brief reaction against democracy, aided by the Spartan army (the rule of the Thirty Tyrants). In 403, democracy was restored by Thrasybulus and an amnesty declared.

==== Corinthian War and the Second Athenian League ====
Sparta's former allies soon turned against her due to her imperialist policies, and Athens's former enemies, Thebes and Corinth, became her allies. Argos, Thebes and Corinth, allied with Athens, fought against Sparta in the Corinthian War of 395–387 BC. In 378, the attempt of the Spartan commander Sphodrias to capture Piraeus by surprise triggered Athens to establish the Second Athenian League. Finally Thebes defeated Sparta in 371 in the Battle of Leuctra. However, other Greek cities, including Athens, turned against Thebes, and its dominance was brought to an end at the Battle of Mantinea (362 BC) with the death of its leader, the military genius Epaminondas.

==== Athens relations with Philip II and Alexander ====
By mid century, however, the northern Greek kingdom of Macedon under Philip II was becoming dominant in Greek affairs despite the opposition of Demosthenes. In 338 BC the army of Philip II of Macedon defeated Athens and Thebes at the Battle of Chaeronea, effectively limiting Athenian independence. During the winter of 338–37 BC Macedonia, Athens and other Greek states became part of the League of Corinth. Further, the conquests of his son, Alexander the Great, widened Greek horizons and made the traditional Greek city state obsolete.

=== Hellenistic period ===
Antipater dissolved the Athenian government and established a plutocratic system in 322 BC at the end of the Lamian War (see also Demetrius Phalereus). Athens remained a wealthy city with a brilliant cultural life, but ceased to be an independent power. Athens became an ally of the Roman Republic during the 2nd century BC. However during the First Mithridatic War, Athenians sided with Mithridates VI against Rome, and Sulla captured and devastated Athens after a siege.

== The city ==
=== Overview ===
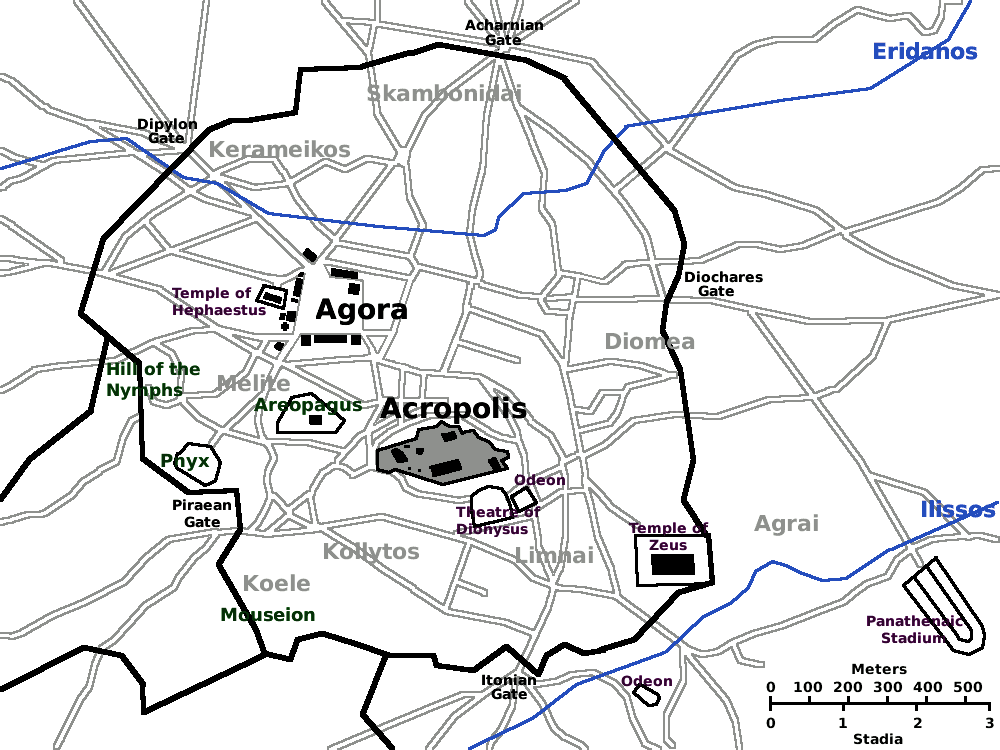
Map of ancient Athens showing the Acropolis in the middle, the Agora to the northwest, and the city walls.

Athens was in Attica, about 30 stadia from the sea, on the southwest slope of Mount Lycabettus, between the small rivers Cephissus to the west, Ilissos to the south, and the Eridanos to the north, the latter of which flowed through the town. The walled city measured about 1.5 km (0.93 mi) in diameter, although at its peak the city had suburbs extending well beyond these walls. The Acropolis was just south of the centre of this walled area. The city was burnt by Xerxes in 480 BC, but was soon rebuilt under the administration of Themistocles, and was adorned with public buildings by Cimon and especially by Pericles, in whose time (461–429 BC) it reached its greatest splendour. Its beauty was chiefly due to its public buildings, for the private houses were mostly insignificant, and its streets badly laid out. Towards the end of the Peloponnesian War, it contained more than 10,000 houses, which at a rate of 12 inhabitants to a house would give a population of 120,000, though some writers make the inhabitants as many as 180,000. Athens consisted of two distinct parts:

- The City, properly so called, divided into The Upper City or Acropolis, and The Lower City, surrounded with walls by Themistocles.
- The port city of Piraeus, also surrounded with walls by Themistocles and connected to the city with the Long Walls, built under Conon and Pericles.

=== City walls ===
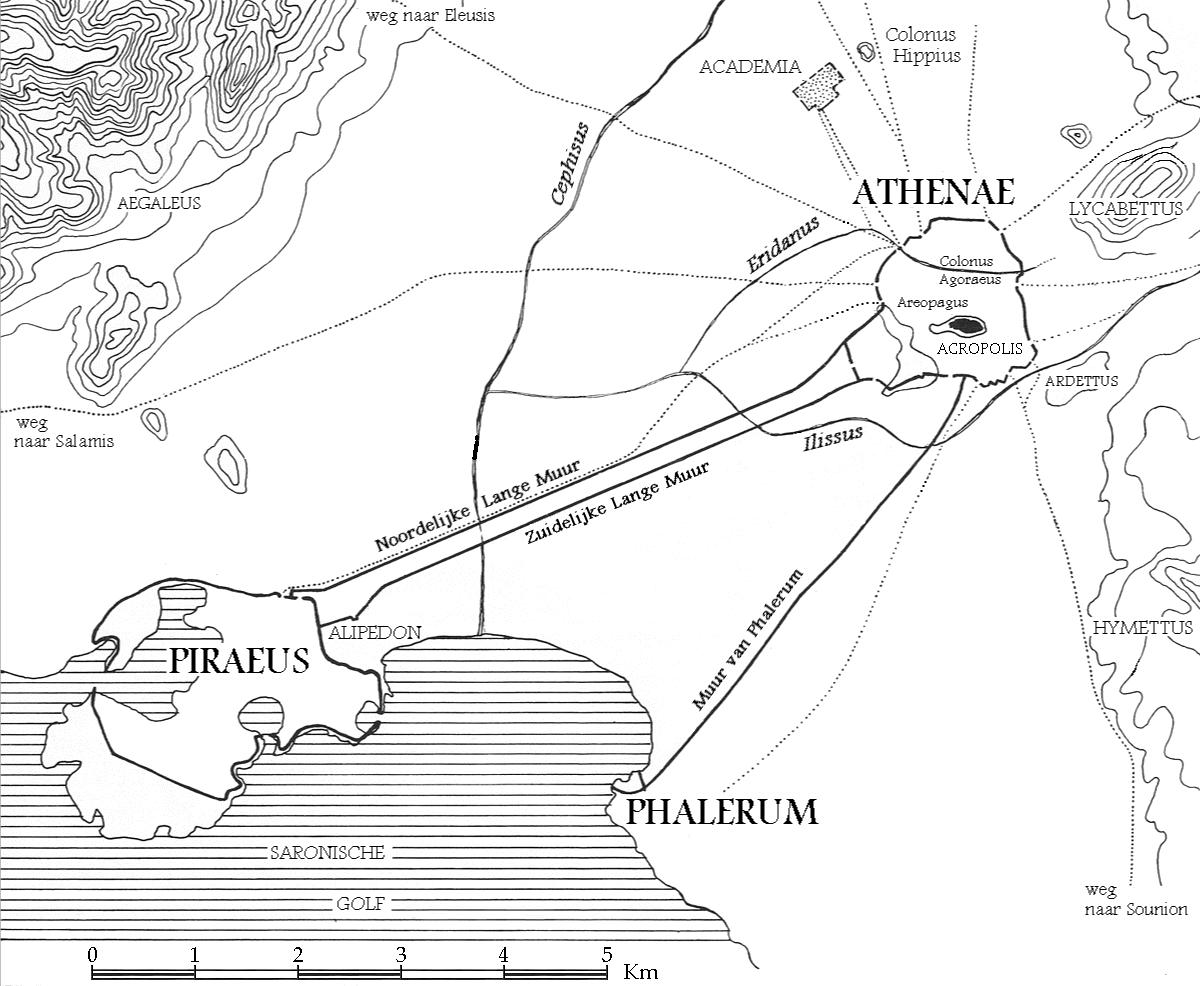
Map of the environs of Athens showing Piraeus, Phalerum, and the Long Walls

The city was surrounded by defensive walls from the Bronze Age and they were rebuilt and extended over the centuries.

In addition the Long Walls consisted of two parallel walls leading to Piraeus, 40 stadia long (4.5 miles, 7 km), running parallel to each other, with a narrow passage between them and, furthermore, a wall to Phalerum on the east, 35 stadia long (4 miles, 6.5 km). There were therefore three long walls in all; but the name Long Walls seems to have been confined to the two leading to the Piraeus, while the one leading to Phalerum was called the Phalerian Wall. The entire circuit of the walls was 174.5 stadia (nearly 22 miles, 35 km), of which 43 stadia (5.5 miles, 9 km) belonged to the city, 75 stadia (9.5 miles, 15 km) to the long walls, and 56.5 stadia (7 miles, 11 km) to Piraeus, Munichia, and Phalerum.

=== Gates ===
There were many gates, among the more important there were:

- On the West side: the Dipylon, the most frequented gate of the city, leading from the inner Kerameikos to the outer Kerameikos, and to the Academy. The Sacred Gate, where the sacred road to Eleusis began. The Knight's Gate, probably between the Hill of the Nymphs and the Pnyx. The Piraean Gate, between the Pnyx and the Mouseion, leading to the carriage road between the Long Walls to the Piraeus. The Melitian Gate, so called because it led to the deme Melite, within the city.
- On the South side: the Gate of the Dead in the neighbourhood of the Mouseion. The Itonian Gate, near the Ilissos, where the road to Phalerum began.
- On the East side: the Gate of Diochares, leading to the Lyceum. The Diomean Gate, leading to Cynosarges and the deme Diomea.
- On the North side: the Acharnian Gate, leading to the deme Acharnai.

=== Acropolis (upper city) ===
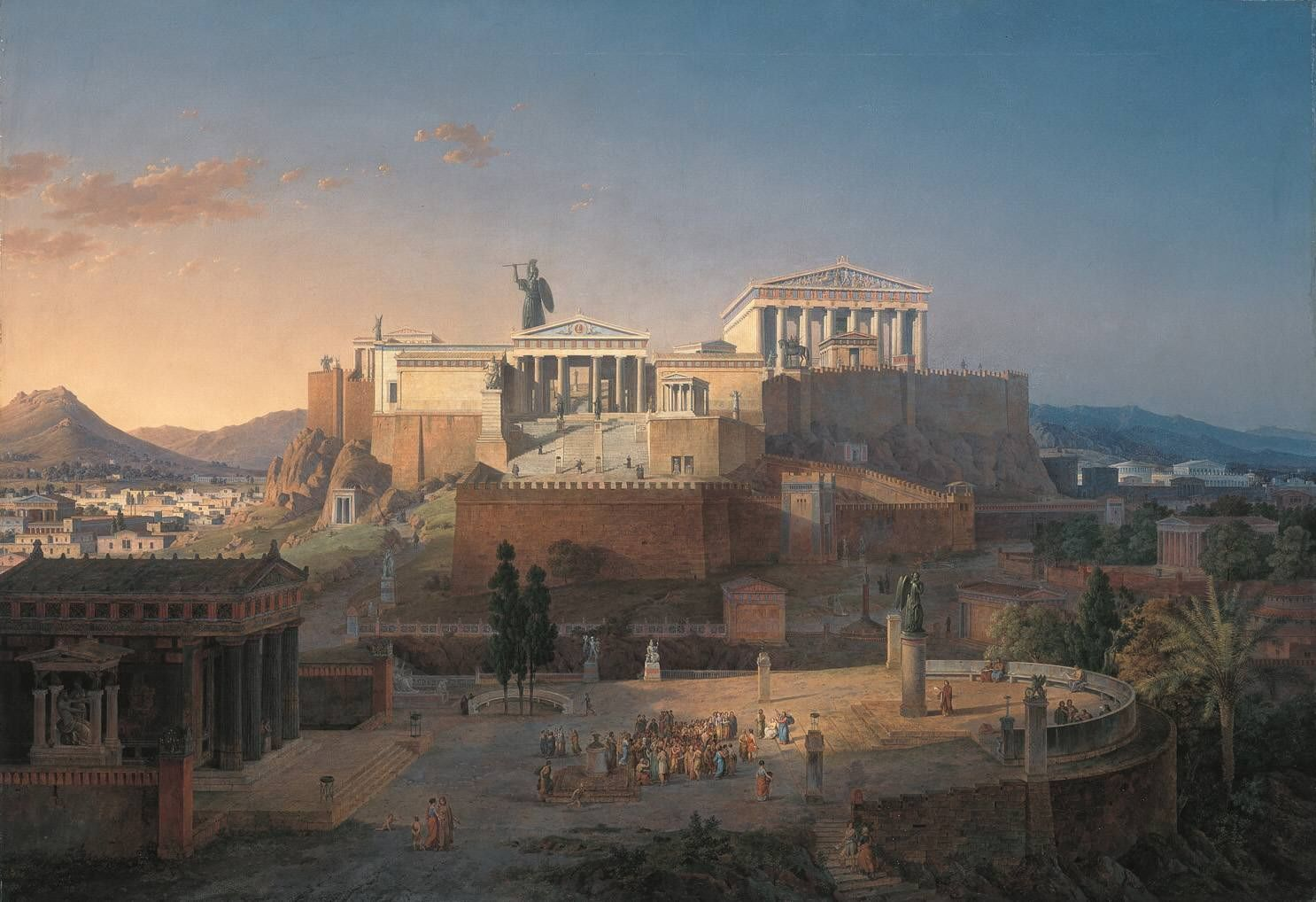
The Acropolis imagined in an 1846 painting by Leo von Klenze

The Acropolis, also called Cecropia from its reputed founder, Cecrops, was a steep rock in the middle of the city, about 50 meters high, 350 meters long, and 150 meters wide; its sides were naturally scarped on all sides except the west end. It was originally surrounded by an ancient Cyclopean wall said to have been built by the Pelasgians. At the time of the Peloponnesian War only the north part of this wall remained, and this portion was still called the Pelasgic Wall; while the south part which had been rebuilt by Cimon, was called the Cimonian Wall. On the west end of the Acropolis, where access is alone practicable, were the magnificent Propylaea, "the Entrances", built by Pericles, before the right wing of which was the small Temple of Athena Nike. The summit of the Acropolis was covered with temples, statues of bronze and marble, and various other works of art. Of the temples, the grandest was the Parthenon, sacred to the "Virgin" goddess Athena; and north of the Parthenon was the magnificent Erechtheion, containing three separate temples, one to Athena Polias, or the "Protectress of the State", the Erechtheion proper, or sanctuary of Erechtheus, and the Pandroseion, or sanctuary of Pandrosos, the daughter of Cecrops. Between the Parthenon and Erechtheion was the colossal Statue of Athena Promachos, or the "Fighter in the Front", whose helmet and spear was the first object on the Acropolis visible from the sea.

=== Agora (lower city) ===
The lower city was built in the plain around the Acropolis, but this plain also contained several hills, especially in the southwest part. On the west side the walls embraced the Hill of the Nymphs and the Pnyx, and to the southeast they ran along beside the Ilissos.

=== Districts ===
- The Inner Kerameikos, or "Potter's Quarter", in the west of the city, extending north as far as the Dipylon gate, by which it was separated from the outer Kerameikos; the Kerameikos contained the Agora, or "market-place", the only one in the city, lying northwest of the Acropolis, and north of the Areopagus.
- The deme Melite, in the west of the city, south of the inner Kerameikos.
- The deme Skambonidai, in the northern part of the city, east of the inner Kerameikos.
- The Kollytos, in the southern part of the city, south and southwest of the Acropolis.
- Koele, a district in the southwest of the city.
- Limnai, a district east of Melite and Kollytos, between the Acropolis and the Ilissos.
- Diomea, a district in the east of the city, near the gate of the same name and the Cynosarges.
- Agrai, a district south of Diomea.

=== Hills ===
- The Areopagus, the "Hill of Ares", west of the Acropolis, which gave its name to the celebrated council that held its sittings there, was accessible on the south side by a flight of steps cut out of the rock.
- The Hill of the Nymphs, northwest of the Areopagus.
- The Pnyx, a semicircular hill, southwest of the Areopagus, where the ekklesia (assemblies) of the people were held in earlier times, for afterwards the people usually met in the Theatre of Dionysus.
- The Mouseion, "the Hill of the Muses", south of the Pnyx and the Areopagus.

=== Streets ===
Among the more important streets, there were:

- The Piraean Street, which led from the Piraean gate to the Agora.
- The Panathenaic Way, which led from the Dipylon gate to the Acropolis via the Agora, along which a solemn procession was made during the Panathenaic Festival.
- The Street of the Tripods, on the east side of the Acropolis.

The streets formed an important space for the social interaction of the Athenians of the classical age.

=== Public buildings ===
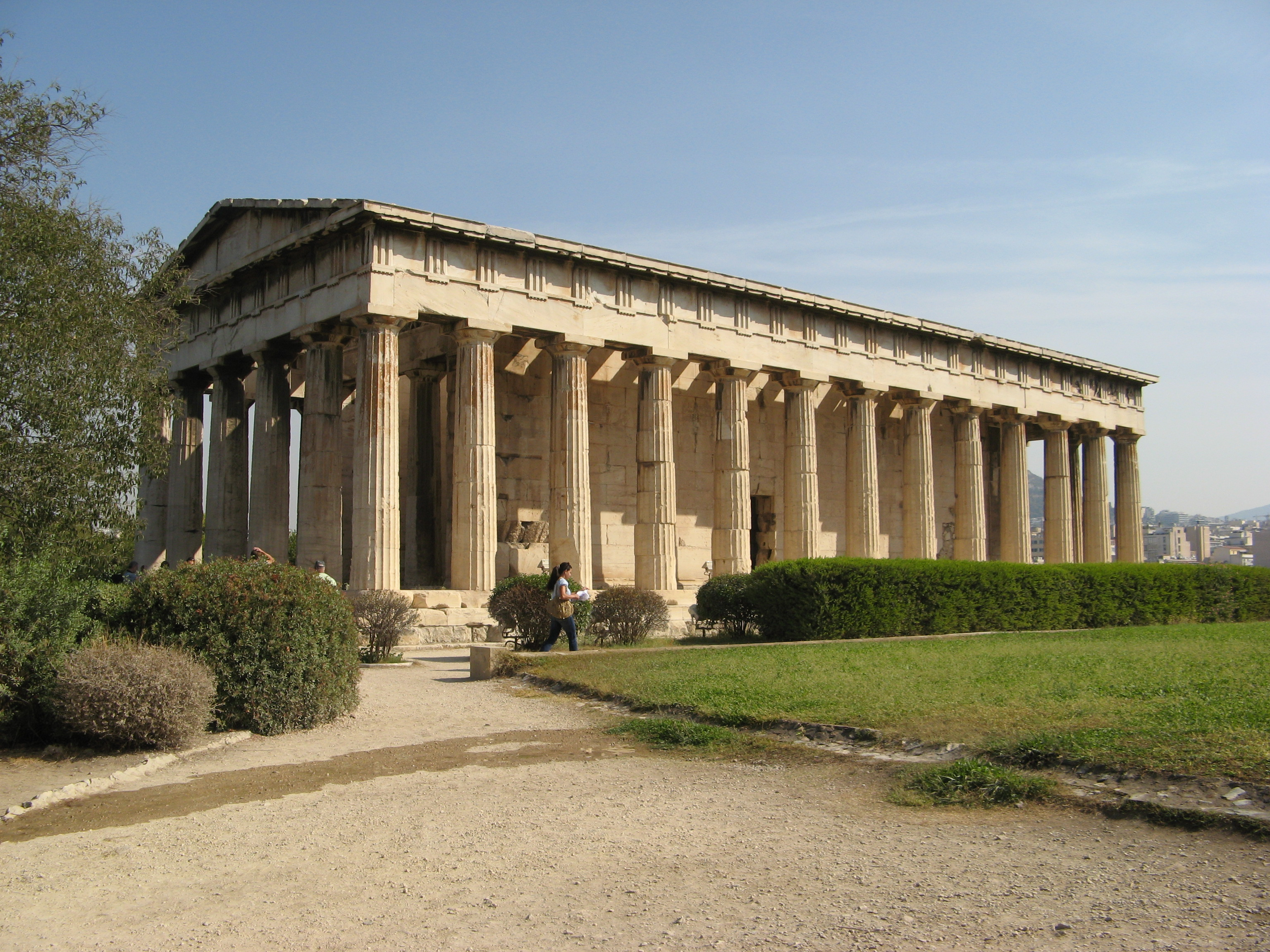
The Temple of Hephaestus in modern-day Athens

- Temples: of these the most important was the Temple of Olympian Zeus, southeast of the Acropolis, near the Ilissos and the fountain Callirrhoë, which was long unfinished, and was first completed by Hadrian. The Temple of Hephaestus, located to the west of the Agora. The Temple of Ares, to the north of the Agora. Metroon, or temple of the mother of the gods, on the west side of the Agora. Besides these, there was a vast number of other temples in all parts of the city.
- The Bouleuterion (Senate House), at the west side of the Agora.
- The Prytaneion, a round building close to the Bouleuterion, built c. 470 BC by Cimon, in which the Prytaneis took their meals and offered their sacrifices.

Plan Roman Agora at Athens

- Stoae: or Colonnades, supported by pillars, and used as places of resort in the heat of the day, of which there were several in Athens. In the Agora there were: the Stoa Basileios, the court of the King-Archon, on the west side of the Agora; the Stoa Eleutherios, or Colonnade of Zeus Eleutherios, on the west side of the Agora; the Stoa Poikile, so called because it was adorned with fresco painting of the Battle of Marathon by Polygnotus, on the north side of the Agora.

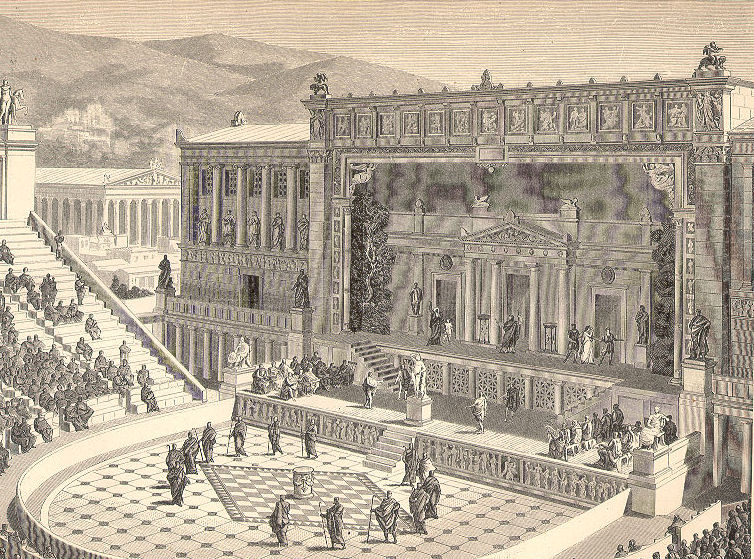
Artist's impression of the Theatre of Dionysus

- Theatres: the Theatre of Dionysus, on the southeast slope of the Acropolis, was the great theatre of the state. Besides this there were Odeons, for contests in vocal and instrumental music, an ancient one near the fountain Callirrhoë, and a second built by Pericles, close to the theatre of Dionysius, on the southeast slope of the Acropolis. The large odeon surviving today, the Odeon of Herodes Atticus was built in Roman times.
- Panathenaic Stadium, south of the Ilissos, in the district Agrai, where the athletic portion of the Panathenaic Games were held.
- The Argyrocopeum (mint) appears to have been in or adjoining the chapel (heroon) of a hero named Stephanephorus.

=== Suburbs ===
- The Outer Kerameikos, northwest of the city, was the finest suburb of Athens; here were buried the Athenians who had fallen in war, and at the further end of it was the Academy, six stadia from the city.
- Cynosarges, east of the city, across the Ilissos, reached from the Diomea gate, a gymnasium sacred to Heracles, where the Cynic Antisthenes taught.
- Lyceum, east of the city, a gymnasium sacred to Apollo Lyceus, where Aristotle taught.

== Legacy ==
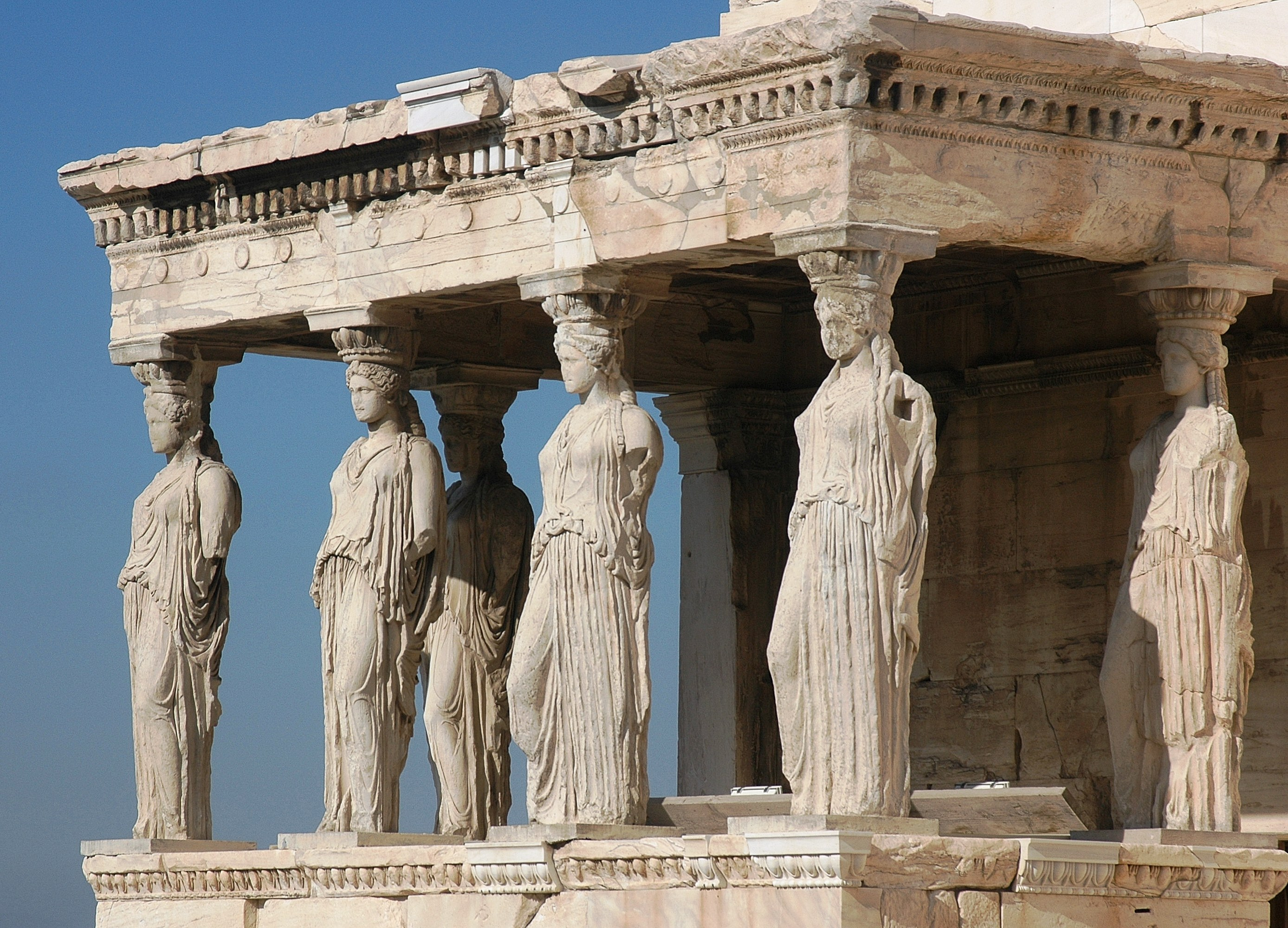
The Karyatides statues of the Erechtheion on its Acropolis

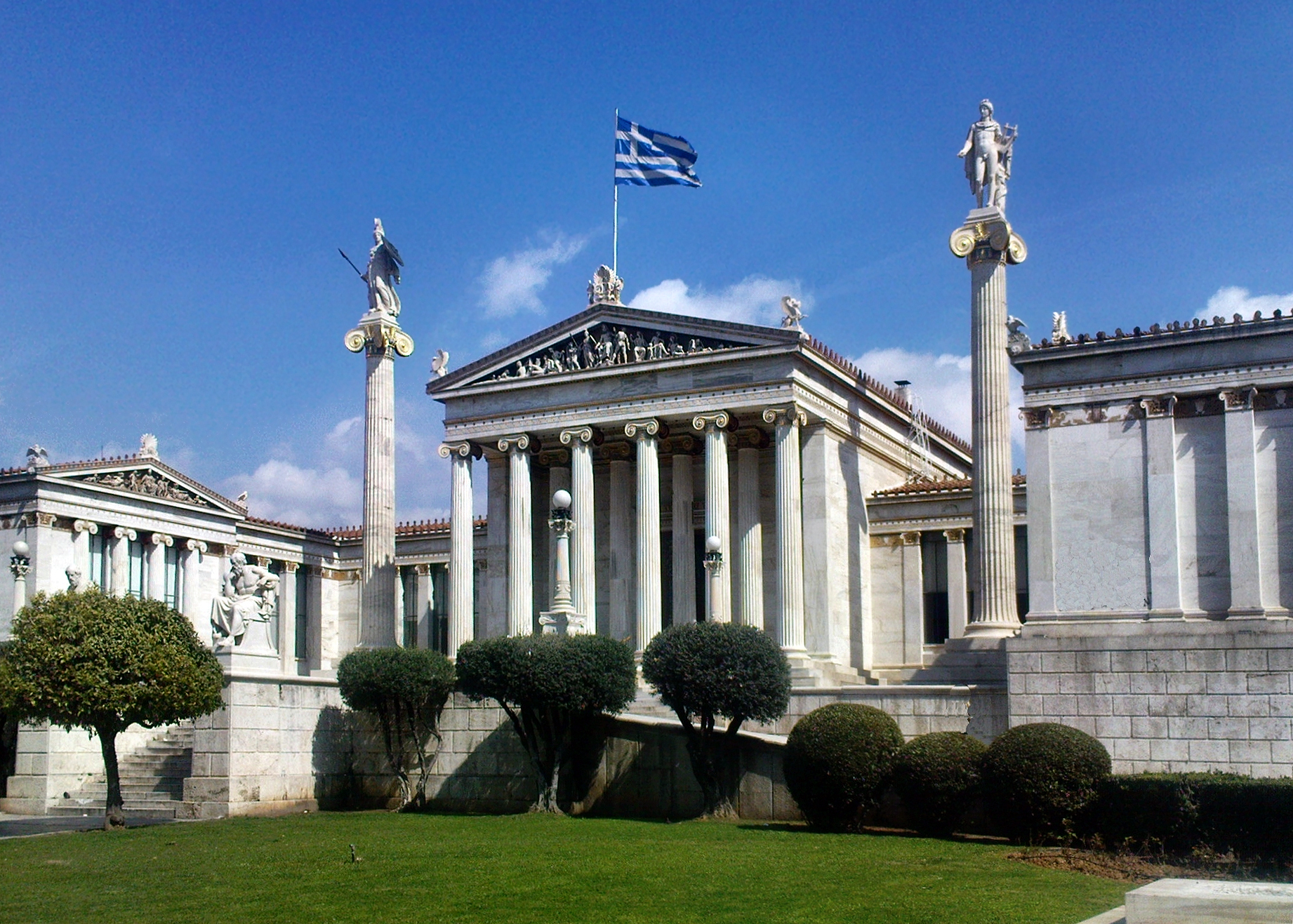
The modern National Academy in Athens, with Apollo and Athena on their columns, and Socrates and Plato seated in front.

The period from the end of the Persian Wars to the Macedonian conquest marked the zenith of Athens as a center of literature, philosophy (see Greek philosophy) and the arts (see Greek theatre). Some of the most important figures of Western cultural and intellectual history lived in Athens during this period: the dramatists Aeschylus, Aristophanes, Euripides and Sophocles, the philosophers Aristotle, Plato, and Socrates, the historians Herodotus, Thucydides and Xenophon, the poet Simonides and the sculptor Phidias. The leading statesman of this period was Pericles, who used the tribute paid by the members of the Delian League to build the Parthenon and other great monuments of classical Athens. The city became, in Pericles's words, an education for Hellas (usually quoted as "the school of Hellas [Greece]").

== Notable Athenians ==
- Simonides of Ceos (c. 556–468 BC), lyric poet
- Aeschylus (c. 525–455 BC), tragic poet
- Themistocles (c. 524–459 BC), politician and general
- Cimon (c. 510–450 BC), statesman and general
- Apollodorus Skiagraphos (5th century BC), painter
- Charitimides (5th century BC), admiral
- Sophocles (c. 496–406 BC), tragic poet
- Pericles (c. 495–429 BC), statesman and general
- Herodotus (c. 484–425 BC), historian, originally from Halicarnassus
- Euripides (c. 480–406 BC), tragic poet
- Pheidias (c. 480–430 BC), sculptor, painter and architect
- Aspasia (c. 470–400 BC), lover and partner of Pericles, possibly a hetaera, originally from Milet
- Phormio, (5th century BC), navarch
- Nicias (c. 470–413 BC), politician and general
- Demosthenes, (5th century BC), general
- Socrates (c. 469–399 BC), philosopher
- Telecleides (fl. 450–430 BC), playwright of the Old Comedy
- Thucydides (c. 460–400 BC), historian and general
- Hermippus (fifth century BC), playwright of the Old Comedy
- Cleon (fl. 435–422 BC), general during the Peloponnesian War
- Alcibiades (c. 450–404 BC), statesman, orator and general
- Ephialtes of Athens (c. 450–461 BC), politician
- Agathon (c. 448–400 BC), tragic poet
- Eupolis (c. 446–411 BC), playwright of the Old Comedy
- Aristophanes (c. 446–386 BC), playwright of the Old Comedy
- Thrasybulus (c. 440–388 BC), general and democratic leader
- Xenophon (c. 430–354 BC), historian, soldier and mercenary, and a student of Socrates
- Iphicrates, (4th century BC) general
- Plato (c. 425–348 BC), philosopher
- Menander (c. 341–290 BC), playwright of the New Comedy
- Aristotle (384–322 BC), philosopher, native from Stagira, Chalkidike
- Demosthenes (384–322 BC), statesman and orator
- Phocion, (4th century BC), politician and general

== See also ==
- Politics
  - Archon basileus
  - Episkopoi
  - Eponymous archon
  - Solonian Constitution
  - Seisachtheia
- Society
  - Women in classical Athens
  - Ancient Greek crafts
- Class
  - Aristoi
  - Banausos
  - Ephebos
  - Eupatridae
  - Geomori
  - Metic
  - Seisachtheia
- Education
  - Ephebic Oath
- Taxation
  - Liturgy
  - Trierarchy
