= Demiurge (disambiguation) =

Demiurge is an artisan-like figure in some philosophies responsible for fashioning and maintaining the physical universe.

Demiurge may also refer to:

- Demiurge (magistrate), a magistrate in Peloponnesian and other Ancient Greek city-states
- Demiurge Studios, a video game developer
- Demiurge Unit, an LED design company
- Project Demiurge, an unpublished expansion of Heresy: Kingdom Come
- "Demiurge", a song by Meshuggah on their 2012 album Koloss

== See also ==
- Demiourgoi, a skilled-worker middle class
- Michael Demiurgos, a fictional character
- Demiurg, a fictional race of T'au Empire-aligned aliens in the Warhammer 40,000 setting
- The dictionary definition of δημιουργός at Wiktionary
