= Ancient Greek crafts =

Handicrafts of Ancient Greece

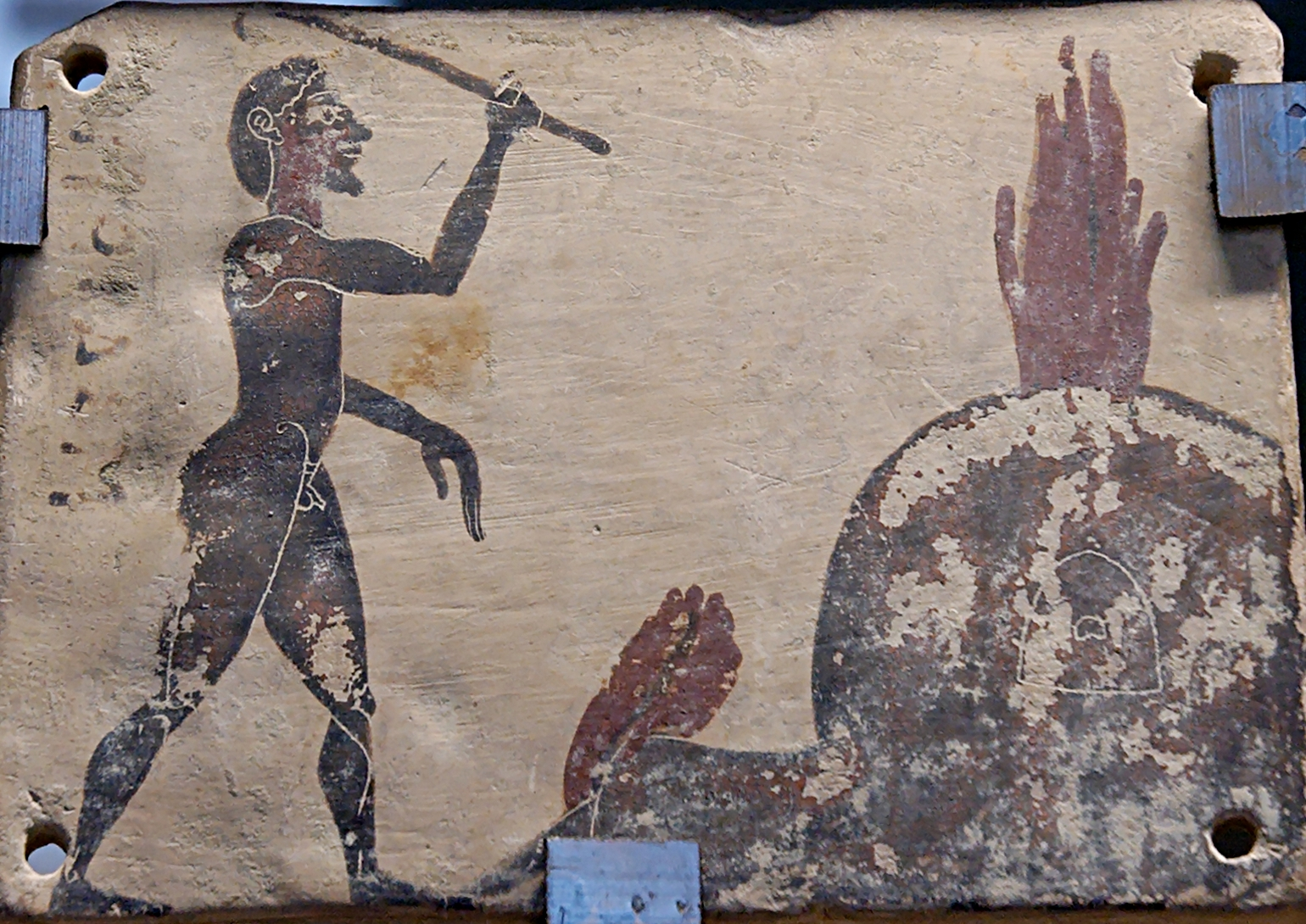
Potter's workshop, corinthian plate from 575 - 550 BC, Louvre Museum.

Ancient Greek crafts (or the craftsmanship in Ancient Greece) was an important but largely undervalued, economic activity. It involved all activities of manufacturing transformation of raw materials, agricultural or not, both in the framework of the oikos and in workshops of size that gathered several tens of workers.

The artisans or "craftsmen" constituted a minority population in the Greek city or Polis, but their presence in the sources is not disproved since it was seen to grow throughout Greek Antiquity.

In Ancient Greece, there were craftsmen of different social strata. Although the metics and slaves were probably in the majority, there were also many free citizens in the workshops. They developed crafts such as musical instruments, sculptures, pottery, etc.

Much of Ancient Greek craftsmanship was part of the domestic sphere. However, the situation gradually changed between the 8th and 4th centuries BC, with the increasing commercialization of the Greek economy. Thus, important tasks as weaving or baking bread were performed only by women before the 6th century BC. With the growth of trade, slave labor began to be used extensively in handicrafts. Only the best quality dyed cloth, and in particular Tyrian purple, was made in the workshops.

== Status of craftsmanship, status of the craftsman ==
=== A tricky definition ===
"Craftsmanship" and also "craftsman" are delicate notions to define, insofar as they refer to relatively modern concepts, the definition of which is irrelevant for Ancient Greece. Historians of antiquity were in agreement in considering an artisan or craftsman an individual with special expertise and who produced material goods intended for marketing outside the agricultural sector. "The artisan could sell his own production, but he should not be confused with the merchant: he manufactures part or all of the product he markets."

Within this framework, some historians add an additional selective criterion considering that craftsmanship was limited to the production of "finished" material goods, which would exclude the extraction of raw materials in quarries or mines, (Note: "The quarry does not interest us as it is the property of the workshop that manufactures the statue; if instead it sells or exports the blocks, even started, it does not enter our field." — Francine Blondé and Arthur Muller (dir), op.cit., p. 835) but such a restriction is not taken into account by other historians.

The ancient Greeks did not usually distinguish the artist from the craftsman. As a result, some activities considered artistic in contemporary times were an integral part of craftsmanship in ancient Greece, insofar as they expressed themselves in the manufacture of a concrete object—no more so than activities "to which the ancients accorded the status of artistic production and the patronage of a Muse" (like music, poetry, etc.)

=== An undervalued activity ===
==== Diverse designations for a varied reality ====
The fact that Ancient Greek does not have a term that encompasses the set of realities to which the contemporary concept of "craftsman" indicates both a lack of homogeneity in this world of craftsmanship and the great diversity of activities and status of those who depended on them. Artisans and craftmen are designated by various terms.

If δημιουργός / demiourgós, which refers to the idea of creation, of making an object, remains rather neutral and general (it designates the potter as well as the aedo or the diviner), the pejorative character of the term βάναυσος / bánausos underlines the contempt of the Greeks for these manual workers (as opposed to the intellectual) who used the fire of their kiln (baunos) to manufacture ceramic or metal objects. (Note: "Subsequently, the word became associated with manual labor and slave labor." — Philippe Casier, "Le statut social des artisans dans la péninsule balkanique et les îles de la mer Egée de 478 à 88 av. J.-C.", en Michel Debidour (dir), Économies et sociétés dans la Grèce égéenne, 478-88 av. J.-C., éditions du temps, 2007, p. 17) The use of the word τεχνίτης / technítês refers to the mastery of a particular skill and goes far beyond the strict field of craftsmanship in that respect, since it also designates the virtuoso actor or soloist.

==== An activity deemed unworthy of a truly free man ====
The sources at our disposal regularly underline the bad image of craftsmen in Greek society, and justify it, as Xenophon: "the so-called manual trades are discredited and, logically, have a very bad reputation in our cities, since they harm the bodies of workers and officials, forcing them to remain seated and to spend the whole day in the shade, and some of them even to be always by the fire. And by effeminizing the bodies, the spirits are also weakened." They are considered unreliable when it comes to taking up arms to defend their city: "they have a bad reputation in dealing with their friends and as defenders of the fatherland. Even in some cities, especially in those which have a reputation for war, no citizen is allowed to engage in manual trades."

Craft activity was considered incompatible with the ideals of autarky, which irrigated the mentality of the time and lead to privilege agriculture above any other productive activity. In fact, the free man was considered to be the one who does not depend on anyone but himself and his ability to exploit the land he owns, his oikos, for his survival. Living on his goods, he does not depend on the will of another, unlike the craftsman who, to survive, must have customers willing to buy what he produces. Aristotle said that "the condition of a free man is that of one who does not live under obligation to his neighbor." In this scheme, the farmer, free "by nature" is more worthy of the status of citizen than the craftsman.

The accuracy of this opinion is illustrated by the ancient authors in the attitude of the craftsmen while they are citizens of a city. Their interventions are presented as disorderly and selfish, not only to defend their individual or class interests: "It is possible to see the craftsmen distracted by many matters in their mind and not at all persevering in one's occupation because of their ambition: some are engaged in agriculture, others participate in trade, others maintain two or three trades and the majority, in democratic cities, corrupt politics by attending the assemblies and get from the paymasters what is necessary." The legitimacy of removing artisans, as Plato does in his ideal city of the Laws, is justified by the quality of the citizen: it is much greater than their professional activity, which deprives them of the σχολή / scholé, of the leisure indispensable to devote themselves sufficiently to their friends and to the affairs of the city.

==== A more nuanced reality ====
However, the strength of this aristocratic ideal, more or less infused in society as a whole, was not everywhere of the same order. If it was imposed in warlike or rural cities such as Sparta or Thebes—where obtaining citizenship was conditioned by the possession of goods, and where four years of exercising artisan functions condemned them to lose it—the cities more open to trade were much more liberal in recognizing the legitimacy of citizenship for those of their inhabitants who practiced craftsmanship.

Thus, in Classical Greece, they would be almost 10,000 (out of a total of 30,000 or 40,000 citizens) in Athens, city where the craftsmanship was particularly developed. This significant proportion of artisans among the citizens of Athens is also underlined, in order to denigrate them, by Socrates: "For which of them are you ashamed of? Of the fullers, the shoemakers, the masons, the blacksmiths, the peasants, the merchants, or those who are peddling about the agora concerned with buying something cheap in order to sell it at a higher price? For it is all of them who compose the assembly."

The proportion of citizens among the artisans was not negligible. According to the accounts of the Erechtheion, among the workers whose status is specified, there were 23% citizens, compared to 58% metics and 19% slaves.

The real possibilities of enrichment by craftsmanship activity can certainly contribute to explain this discrepancy between discourse and reality. Lysias, in one of his speeches against a proposal to withdraw citizenship from citizens of Athens who were not landowners, remarks that among the 5000 Athenians who would thus be excluded from citizenship there would be "a multitude of hoplites, of horsemen", military functions secured by the wealthier citizens of Athens: "craftsmanship can secure fortune to those who practice it, and one cannot explain the opprobrium that weighs on craftsmanship by its financial situation vis-à-vis other citizens, even if the mass of Athenian craftsmen lived relatively frugally from their activity."

On the other hand, the literary sources available to us that evoke craftsmanship are works by authors who all belong, more or less, to the same milieu. That of an intellectual, political and economic elite that was relatively conservative and hostile to the more radical characters of ancient democracy (Plato, Xenophon, Aristotle, etc.) Even if the pejorative discourse disseminated by his sources was, at least in part, shared by the whole of ancient Greek society, we must take into account this relatively partisan and biased character of the sources at our disposal.

=== An activity of slaves and metics ===
Most of the artisans belonged to the slave labor force. These slaves were employed by their owners in tasks of more or less importance according to their skills. Thus, while most of the slaves who worked in the Laurion mines, for example, were employed in less complex tasks, there were also slaves specialized in highly technical work, such as metallurgist, ceramist or sculptor. Some could even run a workshop on behalf of their master and had considerable freedom in their activity. These slaves could live separately (chôris oikountes), being able to constitute a peculium that would allow them to redeem their freedom later, insofar as their master was content to have an annuity for life or a fixed percentage of his profits (system of the ἀποφορά / apophorá, put in place from the 4th century BC in Athens).

In a quarry, it seems that the remuneration of slaves was equivalent to that of free workers, a part of the salary being given to their master. During the construction of the Erechtheion, free and slave craftsmen were paid the same amount, about one drachma per day.

The metics constituted the other community that participated, with a significant number of individuals, in craft activities. Most of them were employed in craft workshops or in commercial activities. For example in Athens, where the Metics were in fact very present—thanks to the advantages granted to them by the city—numerous had made a fortune in craftsmanship activities, such as Syracusan Cephalus, father of the orator Lysias, established in Piraeus and who had 120 slaves in his workshops for the manufacture of shields. The constitution of these fortunes led to the creation of true dynasties of artisans.

== Craftsmanship spaces ==
As Alain Bresson emphasizes, craft production was distinguished by "its geographically very diffuse character, in the countryside, but also in the city." The artisanal space, despite the existence of some specialized quarters for reasons of nuisance or access to raw materials, was intimately mixed with the urban or rural space, in commercial activities, and even in the domestic space.

=== Within the scope of oikos ===
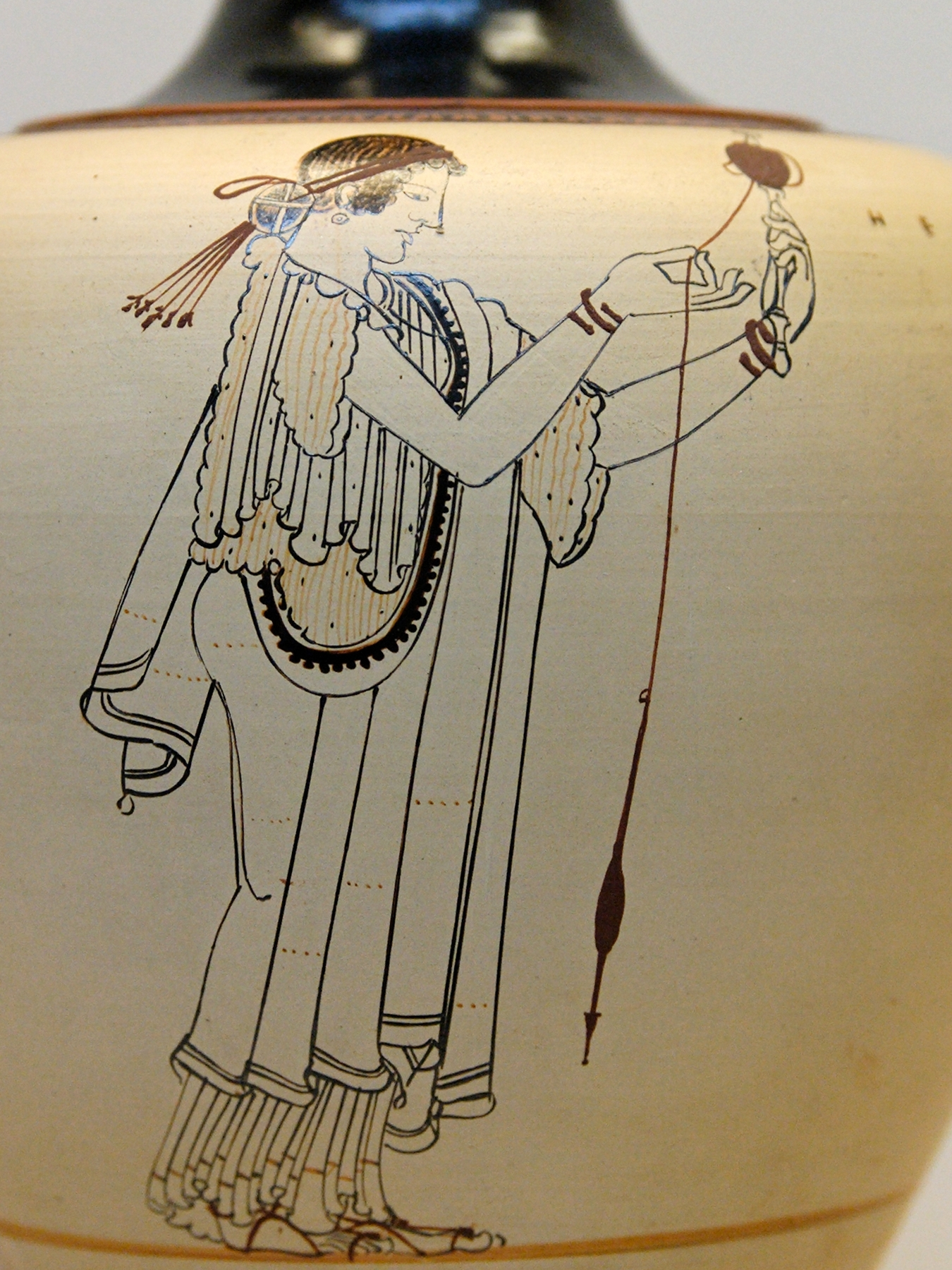
Woman spinning, enocoe by Brygos Painter, ca. 490 BC. British Museum.

Always from the perspective of the autarkic ideal that structures, if not the integrity of the economy of Greek cities, at least the representation that most Greeks made for themselves, craftsmanship—as illustrated by the mythical figure of Penelope weaving her veil while waiting for the return of Ulysses—had in principle an "originally" domestic sense. It aimed at transforming the agricultural raw materials produced in the family domain into useful or marketable objects. Strictly speaking, craftsmanship, as an activity of production of goods "intended for commercialization" does not include domestic craftsmanship except insofar as the latter aims at the sale of the manufactured products. It is, however, often difficult to distinguish what in this domain aims at self-consumption and the strict satisfaction of the internal needs of the oikos, from what is intended for commercialization on the local market. Very often, it seems that the objective was twofold.

One of the main craft activities in the domestic sphere was textile production. The—relatively simple—principle of Greek attire (a draping of a rectangle of wool or linen held by a brooch) did not need a complicated competence. The manufacture of dresses, like the previous phases of carding, spinning and weaving of wool or linen point to feminine functions within the oikos, the erga gynaïka. There are numerous representations on Greek pottery of women spinning wool, and spinning wheels, spindles and weights were sometimes deposited in female tombs, as warriors were buried in the company of their weapons. The woven dresses were intended to dress the members of the household, but also to be partly sold, in order to have cash to buy the specialized productions that one could not make to measure oneself.

Another essential activity of the oikos was the transformation of agricultural production into foodstuffs requested daily by the household. Again, this was a predominantly female task, but as it was heavier than textile work, the women who practiced it were often of servile origin. In the theater of Euripides, the figure of the baker is characteristic of female slavery. The barley grains were roasted and, at the same time, for the needs of the unstable character of barley flour, ground and sieved to give the flour, once kneaded, the form of porridge or cakes, with or without baking. Other activities of transformation of agricultural raw materials within the framework of the farm, on the border between agricultural and artisanal production, were also assumed in the domestic sphere, often by male slaves: pressing olives, crushing grapes, macerating and crushing skins, making charcoal, etc.

The Greek peasant sought, whenever possible, to construct and maintain the buildings of the domain; he also preferred to take care of the manufacture of his tools, at least those of wood. Hesiod, in Works and Days, indicates how to assemble a plow (v. 427-436). In classical times, there were craftsmen in Athens who specialized in the manufacture of plows, "in many Greek regions the Hesiodic tradition continues". Recourse to the specialized craftsman was systematic only for metal tools.

=== Rural craftwork ===
The manufacture of metal objects is the first explanation for the development of specialized trades, external to the oikos, in the Greek countryside. Some of these craftsmen were itinerant, like the maker of scythes arrived to sell sickles instead of weapons, evoked by Aristophanes in Peace (1198-1206), others were sedentary. They provided the peasants with the objects they could not take care of making themselves, found in the Odyssey (XVIII, 328) and in Hesiod (Note: "Pass by without sitting by the forge." —Los Trabajos y los Días, v. 493) references to the forge of the city, where metal tools were manufactured and especially forged.

There were also ceramics workshops in the countryside, intended at the same time to exploit the reaches of raw material, as to show from the Mylassa leases that the geographical implantation of some craft activities were linked to the location of raw material seams: clay for the production of bricks and pottery, cane fields for basketry and/or to respond to the local demand. The Greek peasant was regularly in need of tiles, crockery or amphoras. He also needed a specialist to guarantee him a high quality of manufacture for the pithoi in which he stored his production, insofar as these large half-buried jars were not to be porous and were difficult to replace, which explains their high price (from 30 to 50 drachmae). At a higher level, some workshops could be "coupled" to a farm. Thus, in Thasos, the workshops for the manufacture of amphorae were scattered throughout the island and installed in the vicinity of the large wine-growing estates, in order to provide them with the containers for the export of this crude oil renowned throughout the Greek world of the time. The owners of these workshops (ceramarcas), identified thanks to visible seals on the handle of their amphorae, were therefore very often those who owned these large wine-growing domains devoted to export.

Another figure of rural craftsmanship, the miller, could be attached to a particular farm, but a mill could also be dedicated to a collective use and rented at the request of an owner using labor often servile due to the heavy nature of the work. From the 4th century BC, the carpenter-miller of the village appears in the sources making furniture (beds, tables), or doors. He could be in charge of the construction of the plow, since, as Plato stresses: "the farmer is not likely to make his plow himself, if he wants it to be good, nor his sword, or other agricultural tools."

Rural craftsmanship was thus strongly linked to agricultural activity. This nexus could endure when, installed in the city, the craftsman fed his workshop with the production of the domain he possessed in the chôra, but most often it was through intermediaries to procure raw materials, and his ties with the agricultural world were weak.

=== The urban workshop-store (ergasterion) ===
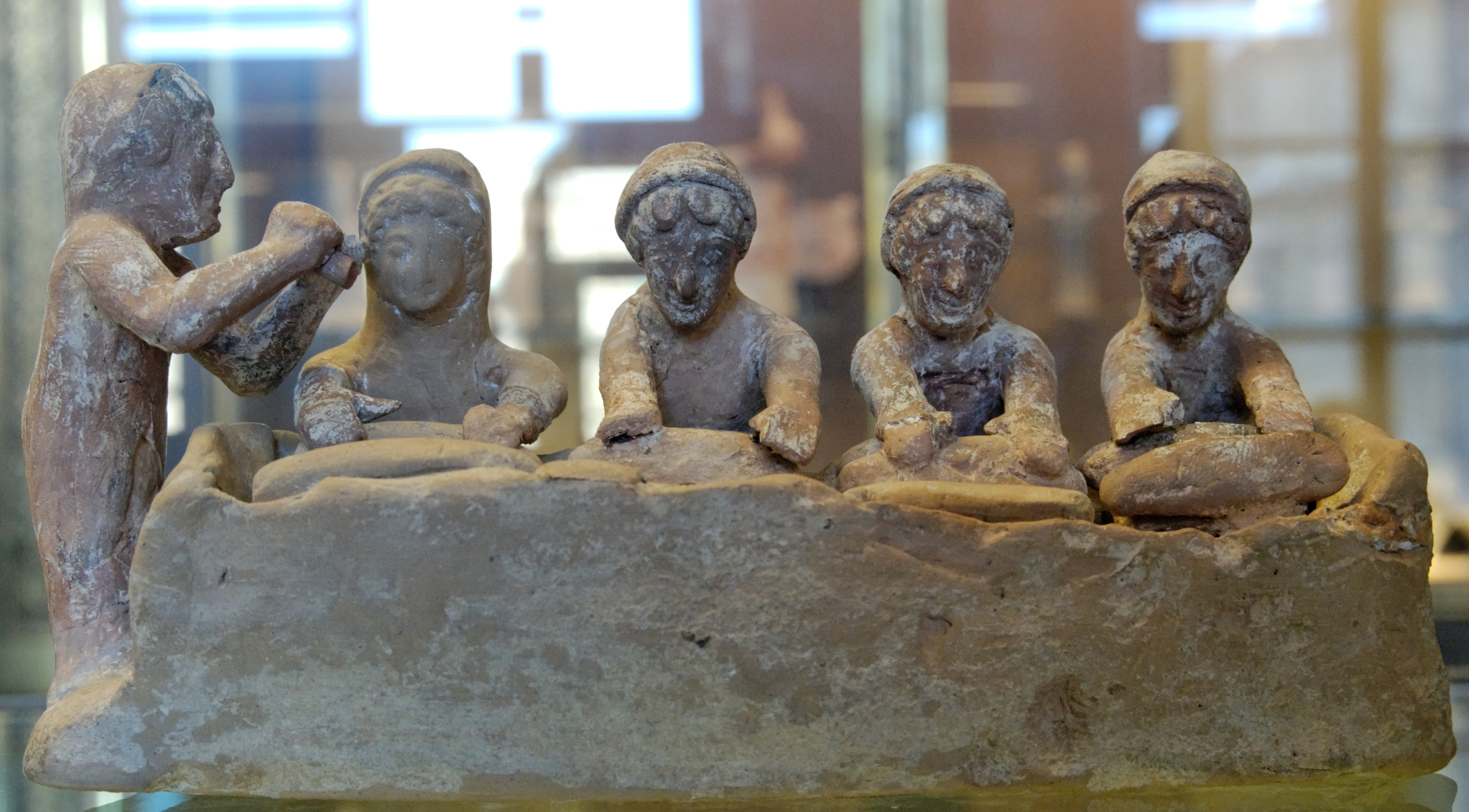
Bakers in the trough, a flute player gives the cadence, terracotta figurines from Thebes, 525 - 475 BC, Louvre Museum.

When installed in the city, the craftsmen worked in an ergasterion, a rather vague term meaning "place of work", a workshop that also served as a store. The location of the workshop in an urban area was justified by the direct marketing of the production. In fact, the store specifically dedicated to the sale was rare outside the agora. This shop-workshop generally consisted of one or two dimly lit rooms—one of which overlooked the street—since the artisan's activity was often carried out within the family. It could also be rented in a public place, agora or portico. This public character, open to the outside, of the craft activity appears in representations of scenes from the Archaic Period or in the 6th century BC, such as that of a craftsman manufacturing under the gaze of his customer the object he has requested.

The ergasteria, insofar as their activity were little polluting, were sometimes scattered throughout the city, as in Delos, but could also be grouped in "artisanal" neighborhoods, possibly specialized—street of the bronze workers, ceramic neighborhood in Athens. They could also be concentrated outside the walls, such as the potters, stone workshops and craftsmen specialized in the processing of agricultural products in Tauric Chersonese, and within the city, but in peripheral areas, such as the potters' quarter of Athens (the ceramic) or Corinth, or closer to the center as the "industrial quarter" of Athens, southwest of Agora in the direction of Piraeus, or more rarely in the center as in Heraclea Lucania.

These varied choices of location were linked to the desire to reconcile, on the basis of local geography, access to raw materials and proximity to the clientele, the latter objective taking priority over the former. The craftsmen wished, and it was the object of their installation in urban areas, to be as close as possible to the demand by settling near the market places without neglecting, as far as possible, the need for an easy access to raw materials, on the spot (stone carvers, potters of Corinth) or in the vicinity, by means of a port—as that of the Piraeus in Athens or of the chora producer of agricultural raw materials (as for example in the Tauric Chersonese).

Their eventual installation on the periphery of the city does not seem to be interpreted as a desire for social segregation. This rejection outside the city was not justified by the possible nuisances (odor, noise, fumes) linked to these activities (such as dyeing), pollution that was sought to be reduced by the provision of specific structures, such as running water ponds for the meat and fish markets of Corinth and Priene.

== Types of craftsmanship ==
=== From the small craftsman shopkeeper to the "master craftsman" ===
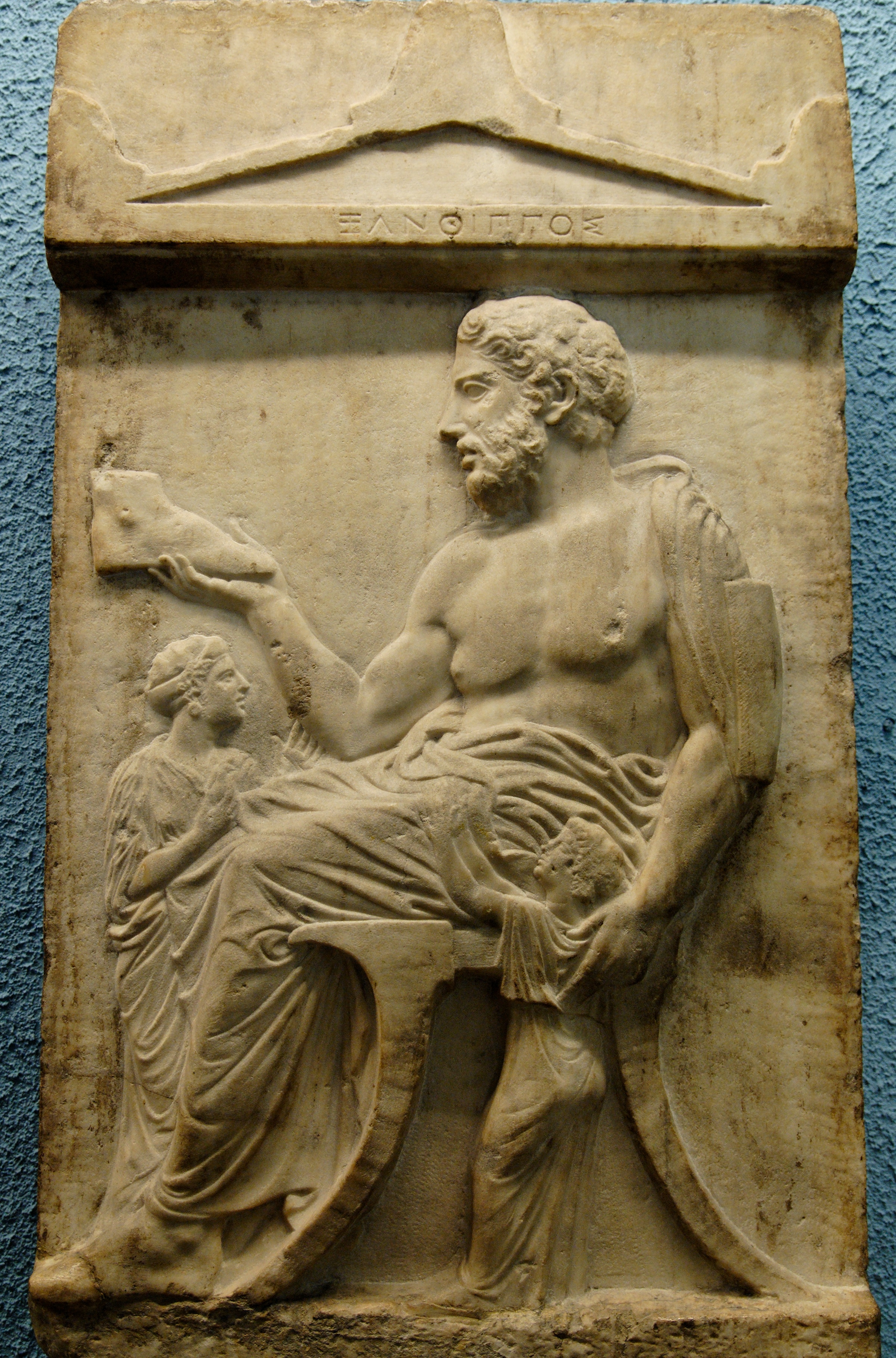
Stele of the shoemaker Janotype, ca. 430 - 420 BC, British Museum.

The size of the workshops varied greatly. Most were run by a craftsmen—alone or with the help of family members—who made simple and cheap products (what he charged for these simple and cheap products reflected the needs he had to live, which were very scarce, and consequently he did not charge for the value of the product) for an exclusively local clientele. Poorly known, these craftsmen who rarely had workers at their disposal, formed "the real artisan fabric of the cities," the mass of the banausoi despised by the aristocratic milieus. They had no stock and worked mostly on demand. This great dependence on the customer only accentuated their poor image in a society of ideal autarky.

The artisan enterprise, whose production was not only intended for a local clientele, was managed by a sort of "master craftsman" with recognized skills and relatively large financial means. It could bring together about thirty workers (often of servile origin) with differentiated tasks. The products resulting from these workshops were often refined or luxurious (clothing, purple dyes, stele engraving, painted pottery, etc.) and could reach very high prices depending on the reputation of the master, whose integration into society was undeniable, as shown for example by the funerary stele of the shoemaker Janotype.

=== Development and problems of the "large workshops" ===
There was also, especially in the large cities, a third type of craft enterprise of a much larger size, whose owner was not necessarily a "craftsman", but who could invest in craft production and marketing, relying on the use of slave labor. It is known in Athens since the 5th century BC, but they develop on the scale of the Greek world in the Hellenistic era. Cleon's tannery or Hyperbolus's lamp-making workshops, both politicians in the foreground in Athens at the end of the 5th century BC, shields factory of the metics originating from Sicily, Cephalus, father of the orator Lysias, with his 120 slaves, Demosthenes' father's knife and bed factory, which were not "small businesses", since with 50 workers in all, they brought in 4200 drachmas a year.

The substantial number of personnel in these workshops should not lead one to suppose that they worked all together in one place, in a sort of "manufacture". With one exception, "even for serial activities, one cannot properly speak of vast workshops, the production work was not carried out with factory-like structures." What is known of the craftsmanship of this period, "either from the remains left by the workshops on the ground, or from representations in paintings of ceramic vessels, proves that the workers could be counted on the fingers of one hand." It can thus be concluded that the hundred or so slave armorers of Cephalus were undoubtedly distributed in several different workshops, whose production was specific and sold separately. (Note: "The dimension of the workshop (the number of people who worked in it) has no meaning in terms of the mode of production, in a "craft cell" associating, according to the trades, a variable but always restricted number of workers. The increase in production, in his case is not obtained by that of productivity, but by the multiplication of the cells that produce, many of which could belong to the same employer, which makes him therefore an "industrialist": it was certainly what represented the company of Lysias and his brother." —Édouard Will, op. cit., p. 657)

These large workshops should not be considered aggressive enterprises that had at their head a kind of "captains of industry" ready to flood the market with their production by destroying the competition of smaller producers. On the contrary, craftsmanship was seen as a ἀκίνδυνος (akinduno, riskless) activity, which is why some wealthy Athenians sought to invest in it in order to diversify their assets and, possibly, enjoy an environment conducive to the development of certain activities—the shield factories of Cephalus and Pasion can be interpreted in this way. The owners of these workshops were often content to obtain the payment of a fixed rent, either thanks to their slaves who were responsible for the management of this property (system of the apophora) or through the rent paid by a metics, such as the freedman Formion who delivered every year 60 mines to the two sons of Pasion, which allowed them to engage in politics and to assume costly liturgies.

If craftsmanship was a low-risk activity, it was "because the Greek world follows demand and never precedes it." Whatever the size of these craft enterprises, they produced only on customer demand. There was no supply-side economy, no production ever or almost never without a precise order. Undoubtedly, this is what explains why large workshops of this type were not more moderately developed, without ever making small workshops disappear or even gaining market share: by developing these activities too much without paying attention to the weakness of demand, these "chrématistai owners ", would necessarily have suffered due to the fact of the reduced character of potential demand, (Note: Phenomenon evoked by Xenophon, "Los ingresos públicos" iv.6-7: "In the works of the silver mines everyone says that there is a lack of workers. And, indeed, it does not happen as when there are many boilermakers, who do not value the work of forging and have to abandon the trade"; on these questions. —Philippe Gauthier, Un commentaire historique des Poroi de Xénophon, Droz, 1976, pp. 120-131) outside a particular juncture (manufacture of weapons in a war context.)

== See also ==
- Ancient Greek art
- Economy of ancient Greece
- Agriculture in ancient Greece

== Bibliography ==
- Francine Blondé, Arthur Muller, L'artisanat en Grèce ancienne: les Productions, les Diffusions: actes du colloque de Lyon, 10-11 décembre 1998, Ceges-Université Lille 3, 2000, ISBN 978-2-84467-020-5
- Philippe Casier, «Le statut social des artisans dans la péninsule balkanique et les îles de la mer Egée de 478 à 88 av. J.-C.», in Michel Debildour, Économies et sociétés dans la Grèce égéenne 478-88 av. J.-C., Éditions du temps, 2007, ISBN 978-2-84274-416-8
- Christophe Feyel, Les artisans dans les sanctuaires grecs aux époques classique et hellénistique à travers la documentation financière en Grèce, École française d'Athènes, 2006
