= Argyrocopeum =

Argyrocopeum, also transliterated as Argyrocopeion or Argyrokopeion (Ancient Greek: ἀργυροκοπείον) was the place where money was coined in ancient Greece, especially minting with silver. In Athens it appears to have been in or adjoining the chapel (heroön) of a hero named Stephanephorus, in which were kept the standard weights for the coins. In similar fashion, standard weights were kept in the Temple of Juno Moneta in the Roman Forum.

== See also ==
- Laurium, the place of the silver mint in Attica, outside Athens.
