= Banausos =

Working class in Ancient Greece

Banausos (Ancient Greek: βάναυσος, plural βάναυσοι, banausoi) is a pejorative term from Ancient Greece applied to the class of manual laborers or artisans, such as blacksmiths, potters, or carpenters. The related abstract noun βαναυσία (banausia), defined by Hesychius as "every craft (τέχνη) [conducted] by means of fire," reflects a folk etymology linking it to "furnace" (βαῦνος, baunos) and "to dry" (αὔω, auō), though its true origins are unknown and it appears only in Attic-Ionic texts from the 5th century BC onward. In contrast, epic heroes in Greek literature called their smiths δημιουργοί (dēmiourgoi), a term for skilled public workers, highlighting a cultural distinction.

The term has been adapted into English as the rare word banausic, appearing around 1845 with the Victorian revival of classical learning. According to Dagobert D. Runes’ Dictionary of Philosophy, it means "vulgar and illiberal," especially for arts or occupations thought to "deform the body or the mind."

In Wilhelmine Germany and later, banausisch became an insult tied to the Kultur-movement, alongside myths that the German soul was Greek, ancient Greeks were blond, and modern Greeks were unrelated to them—ideas accepted by scholars like Edith Hamilton in her early career but challenged after World War II. Today, in German, Banause means an uncouth person indifferent to high culture, akin to the English "philistine."

In 1935, a colleague of Gilbert Murray extended the term beyond Greek usage, calling journalists, lawyers, or businessmen focused on profit rather than virtue "banausoi rather than men."

== Bibliography ==
- Chap II, "Opinions, Passions, and Interests", Republics, Ancient and Modern, Vol. I, Paul A. Rahe, University of North Carolina Press, Chapel Hill and London, 1992.
- The People of Aristophanes, Victor Ehrenberg, New York, 1962. pp 113–146.
- Greek Popular Morality in the Time of Plato and Aristotle, Kenneth J. Dover, Oxford, 1974. pp 39–41; 172–174.
- "L'idée de travail dans la Grèce archaïque", André Aymard, Journal de psychologie 41, 1948. pp 29–45.
- "Hiérarchie du travail et autarcie individuelle", André Aymard, Études d'histoire ancienne, Paris, 1967. pp 316–333.
- "Work and Nature in Ancient Greece", Jean-Pierre Vernant, Myth and Thought among the Greeks, London, 1983. pp 248–270.

Commentary works

- "Humanism in Politics and Economics", Greek Ideals and Modern Life, Sir R. W. Livingstone, Martin Classical Lectures, Vol. V, Harvard University Press, Cambridge, MA., 1935.
