= Geomori (Athens) =

Inhabitants of Attica

The Geomori or Geomoroi (Ancient Greek: γεωμόροι) were one of the three classes into which Theseus is said to have divided the inhabitants of Attica. The exact divisions between the three classes is uncertain, but the geomori ranked between the wealthy eupatrids, the only class who were permitted to hold the highest civil and religious offices, and the poorer demiourgoi.

== Class distinctions ==
Some scholars have noted that the precise meaning of these classes, as well as the nature of the division, are obscure. Even though one can say that nobles, husbandmen, and artisans belong to the eupatrids, geomori, and demiourgoi classes, respectively, there are no methods to ascertain any particulars respecting the relation in which the geomoroi stood to the two other classes. It is also not known whether an individual can transcend or be demoted to another class, such as the case of the poorer nobles who might have fallen into the ranks of the geomori. One, however, could turn to Grecian historians for insight, particularly in the way they described the three Athenian social classes as "quasi-equal," with the eupatrids exceeding the others in dignity; the geomori exceeding in usefulness; and, the demiourgoi exceeding in number.

== Geomori concept ==
The term geomori may either signify independent land-owners, or peasants who cultivated the lands of others as tenants. The geomoroi have, accordingly, by some writers been thought to be free land-owners, while others have conceived them to have been a class of tenants. It seems, however, inconsistent with the state of affairs in Attica, as well as with the manner in which the name geomoroi was used in other Greek states, to suppose that the whole class consisted of the latter only; there were undoubtedly among them a considerable number of freemen who cultivated their own lands, but had by their birth no claims to the rights and privileges of the nobles. What is certain for some historians is that geomori and the social stratification in Attica is similar to the social distinctions adopted by other societies that have emerged from nomadism.

There are no recorded political distinctions between the geomoroi and the demiourgoi; and it may either be that there existed none at all or if there were any originally, that they gradually vanished. This would account for the fact that Dionysius (ii. 8) only mentions two classes of Atticans; one corresponding to the Roman patricians, the other to the plebeians. There are sources, however, such as Aristotle whose works indicated that the class divisions by Theseus marked the modification to the constitution in the direction of popular government. Some authors also consider the social divisions as a mechanism to unite the separate communities into a united country by describing the function and privileges of the people who came from these within the new society.

In Samos, the name geomoroi was applied to the oligarchical party, consisting of the wealthy and powerful. In Syracuse, the aristocratic party was likewise called gamoroi, in opposition to the demos.
