= Chrematistics =

Economics theory studying money

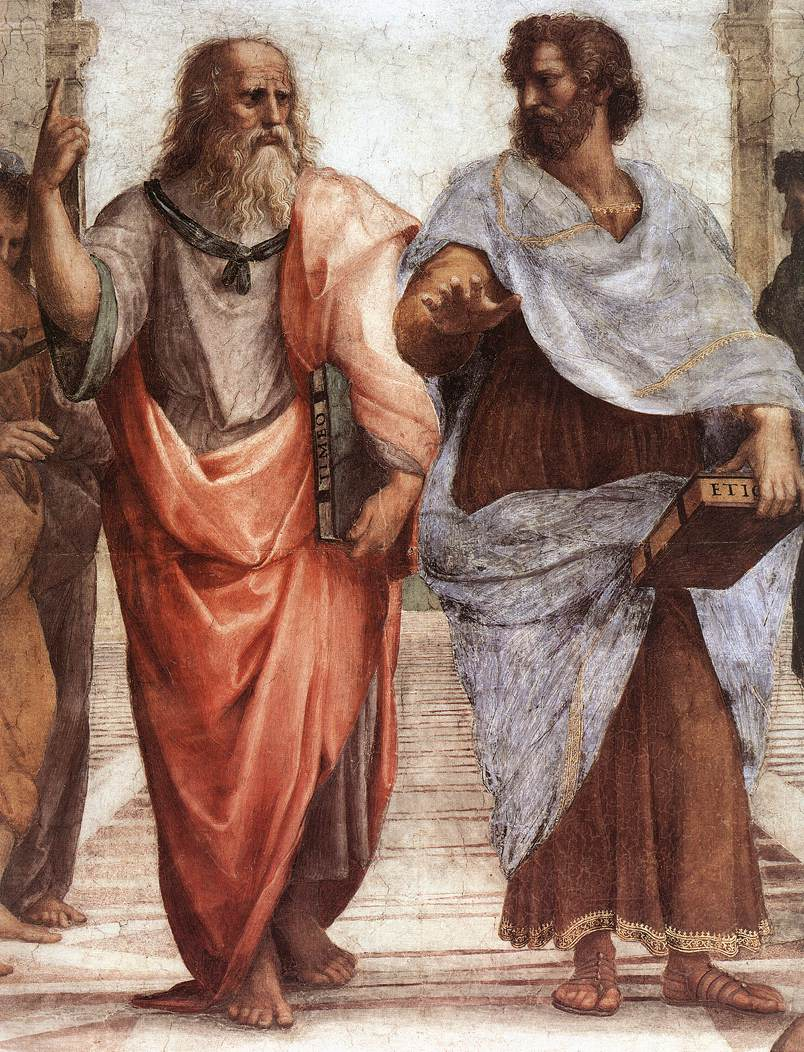
Plato (left) and Aristotle (right)

Chrematistics (from Greek: χρηματιστική), or the study of wealth or a particular theory of wealth as measured in money, has historically had varying levels of acceptability in Western culture.

== Ancient Greece ==
Aristotle established a difference between economics and chrematistics that would be foundational in medieval thought. Chrematistics for Aristotle, was the accumulation of money for its own sake, especially by usury, an unnatural activity that dehumanizes those who practice it. Economics for Aristotle is the natural use of money as a medium of exchange.

According to Aristotle, the "necessary" economy is licit if the sale of goods is made directly between the producer and buyer at the right price; it does not generate a value-added product. By contrast, it is illicit if the producer purchases for resale to consumers at a higher price, generating added value. The money must be only a medium of exchange and measure of value. This system of direct sales only works when there are limited producers and consumers.

== Middle Ages ==
The Catholic Church maintained this economic doctrine throughout the Middle Ages. Saint Thomas Aquinas accepted capital accumulation if it served for virtuous purposes as charity.

== Modern ==
Although Martin Luther raged against usury and extortion, modern sociologists have argued that he inspired doctrines that assisted in the spread of capitalistic practices in early modern Europe. Max Weber argued that Protestant sects emphasized frugality, sobriety, deferred consumption, and saving.

In Karl Marx's Das Kapital, Marx developed a labor theory of value inspired by Aristotle's notions of exchange and highlighting the consequences of what he also calls auri sacra fames (damned thirst for gold), a Latin reference of Virgil to the passion of money for money itself.

== Chrematistics theory in marketing ==
From the marketing systems perspective, chrematistics refers to the process of manipulatively influencing marketing systems' structure, functions, and outcomes perpetuated by marketing system actors wielding required power, knowledge, and skills. To study chrematistics in marketing systems, researchers can employ the following macromarketing research methodology proposed by Kadirov et al. (2016):

- frame a marketing system for analysis;
- collect rich data (both qualitative and quantitative) about the marketing system under focus;
- analyse the following symptoms: community needs myopia, demand engineering, commercialisation, and the view of "success";
- analyse opportunity costs related to marketing systems design and collective norms;
- analyse rhetorical mechanisms at a societal level, and
- study how institutional changes are transformed into revenue streams.

== See also ==
- Critique of political economy
- Economic anthropology
