= Demiurge Unit =

LEDARTIST
- Company type: Limited (Ltd.)
- Industry: LED Lighting Industry
- Founded: New York City
- Headquarters: Hong Kong, People's Republic of China
- Services: LED Lighting Design
- Website: http://www.demiurgeunit.com

Demiurge Unit Limited is a LED design company with offices in New York and Hong Kong. Founded by LED artist Teddy Lo in New York, Demiurge Unit expanded its operation into Hong Kong in 2005.

== Business and Services ==
Demiurge Unit focuses on LED illumination technology. It offers services in (1) LED design & consultancy and (2) art direction, graphic design and contemporary art. LED design & consultancy includes architectural and façade lighting, interior and events lighting, and LED signage. Art direction includes interactive design, graphic and motion graphics, artistic LED programming, and overall project art direction.

== Awards ==
- Innovative Entrepreneur 2007 by Junior Chamber International – City Junior Chamber
- 2006 Hong Kong Awards for Industries – Innovative & Creativity Certificate of Merit by Hong Kong General Chamber of Commerce
- China Solid State Lighting Design Award by China Solid State Lighting Association

== Memberships ==
- Ambassadors of Design (Hong Kong)
- Hong Kong Design Centre
- Hong Kong Design Association
- Hong Kong General Chamber of Commerce
- Junior Chamber International
- Innovator Entrepreneur
- CIE (Commission Internationale de l’Eclairage) Hong Kong

== Projects ==
LED Design : Innocentre, MIST, AIDS Concern, VIA-Stella, Innovative & Design Expo, Business of Design Week, Miramar Shopping Mall, Russell Simon's Art for Life, KEF, Philips LED Graphics, Good Luck Beijing

Art Direction : DTFU, Magic Mirror, One Red Dot, Untitled, BODW, Common Space Branding, Common Space x Samsung Branding, Equestrian, KEF Event Graphics, Philips LED Graphics, Pi Branding, INNO MIST Animation, Singapore Exhibition, VIA
