= Eupatridae =

Ancient Greek nobility

The Eupatridae /juːˈpætrɪdiː/ (literally "well-fathered", i.e. "offspring of noble fathers" or "the well-born") are thought of as the ancient nobility of the Greek region of Attica. Their existence as a class has been doubted.

== Origin ==
Tradition ascribes to Theseus, whom it also regards as the author of the union (synoecism) of Attica around Athens as a political centre, the division of the Attic population into three classes, Eupatridae, Geomori and Demiurgi. The lexicographers mention as characteristics of the Eupatridae that they are the autochthonous population, the dwellers in the city, the descendants of the royal stock. Philippides of Paiania, son of Philomelos, hailed from Attica nobility and was one of the richest Athenians in the age of Lycurgus of Athens. It is probable that, after the time of the synoecism, the nobles who had hitherto governed the various independent communities were obliged to reside in Athens, now the seat of government; and at the beginning of Athenian history the noble clans form a class which has the monopoly of political privilege. It is possible that, in very early times, the Eupatridae were the only full citizens of Athens; for the evidence suggests that they alone belonged to the phratries, and the division into phratries must have covered the whole citizen body. It is indeed just possible that the term may originally have signified true member of a clan, since membership of a phratry was a characteristic of each clan. It is not probable that the Eupatrid families were all autochthonous, even in the loose sense of that term. Some had no doubt immigrated to Attica when the rest had long been settled there. Traces of this union of immigrants with older inhabitants have been detected in the combination of Zeus Herkeios with Apollo Patros as the ancient gods of the phratry.

== Relation to other classes ==
The exact relation of the Eupatridae to the other two classes has been a matter of dispute. It seems probable that the Eupatridae were the governing class, the only recognized nobility, the Geomori—the country inhabitants of all ranks, and the Demiurgi—the commercial and artisan population. The division attributed to Theseus is always spoken of by ancient authorities as a division of the entire population; but Georg Busolt maintained the view that the three classes represent three elements in the Attic nobility, namely, the city nobility, the landed nobility and the commercial nobility, and exclude altogether the mass of the population. At any rate, it seems certain from the little we know of the early constitutional history of Athens, that the Eupatridae represent the only nobility that had any political recognition in early times.

== Political history ==
The political history of the Eupatridae is a gradual curtailment of privilege. They were at the height of their power in the period during the limitation of the monarchy. They alone held the two offices, those of polemarch and archon, which were instituted during the 8th century BC to restrict the powers of the kings. In 712 BC, the office of the king was itself thrown open to all Eupatrids. Thus, they had the entire administration control and were the sole dispensers of justice in the state. At this later privilege, which perhaps formed the strongest bulwark of the authority of the Eupatridae, a severe blow was struck (c. 621 BC) by the publication of a criminal code by Draco, which was followed by the more detailed and permanent code of Solon (c. 594 BC), who further threw open the highest offices to any citizen possessed of a certain amount of landed property, thus putting the claims of the Eupatridae to political influence on a level with those of the wealthier citizens of all classes. The most highly coveted office at this time was not that of basileus, which, like that of the rex sacrorum in Rome, had been stripped of all save its religious authority, but that of the archon; soon after the legislation of Solon, repeated struggles for this office between the Eupatridae and leading members of the other two classes resulted in a temporary change. Ten archons were appointed, five of whom were to be Eupatridae, three Agroeci (i.e. Geomori), and two Demiurgi (Aristotle, Ath. Pol. xiii.2). This arrangement, though short-lived, is evidence of the decay of the political influence of the Eupatridae, and it is not likely that they recovered, even in practice, any real control of the government. By the middle of the 6th century BC, the political influence of birth was at an end.

The name Eupatridae survived in historical times, but the Eupatridae were then excluded from the cult of the Semnae at Athens, and also held the hereditary office of an expounder of the law in connection with purification from the guilt of murder. The combination of these two characteristics suggests some connection with the legend of Orestes. Again, Isocrates (xvi.25) says of Alcibiades that his grandfather was a Eupatrid and his grandmother an Alcmaeonid, which suggests that in the 5th century, BC the Eupatrids were a single clan, like the Alcmaeonids, and that the name had acquired a new signification. Pursuing these two suggestions has established the probability that this, Eupatrid, clan traced its origin to Orestes, and derived its name from the hero, who was above all a benefactor of his father. The word will well bear this sense in the two passages in which Sophocles (Electra, 162, 859) applies it to Orestes; and it is likely enough that after the disappearance of the old Eupatridae as a political corporation, the name was adopted in a different sense, but not without a claim to the distinction inherent in the older sense, by one of the oldest of the clans.

== Bibliography ==
- Meister, Jan B. (2020). ‹Adel› und gesellschaftliche Differenzierung im archaischen und frühklassischen Griechenland [‘Nobility’ and social differentiation in archaic and early classical Greece]. Historia Einzelschriften, vol. 263. Stuttgart: Franz Steiner, ISBN 978-3-515-12715-8, pp. 275-294.
