= Demiourgoi =

Ancient Attican artisan class

The Demiourgoi (Gr. δημιουργός, from δήμιος, of or for the people, and ἒργον, work) were an artisan class in Attica in Ancient Greece that formed one of the three classes, along with the Eupatridae and the Geomori, into which the early population was divided. They represented either a class of the whole population, or, according to Busolt, a commercial nobility. In the sense of “worker for the people” the word was used throughout the Peloponnese, with the exception of Sparta, and in many parts of Greece, for a higher magistrate. The demiurgi among other officials represent Elis and Mantineia at the treaty of peace between Athens, Argos, Elis and Mantineia in 420 B.C. In the Achaean League, the name is given to ten elective officers who presided over the assembly, and Corinth sent “Epidemiurgi” every year to Potidaea, officials who apparently answered to the Spartan harmosts.

In Homer the term has a wide application, including not only hand-workers but even heralds and physicians.
