= Peplos =

Garment worn by women of Ancient Greece

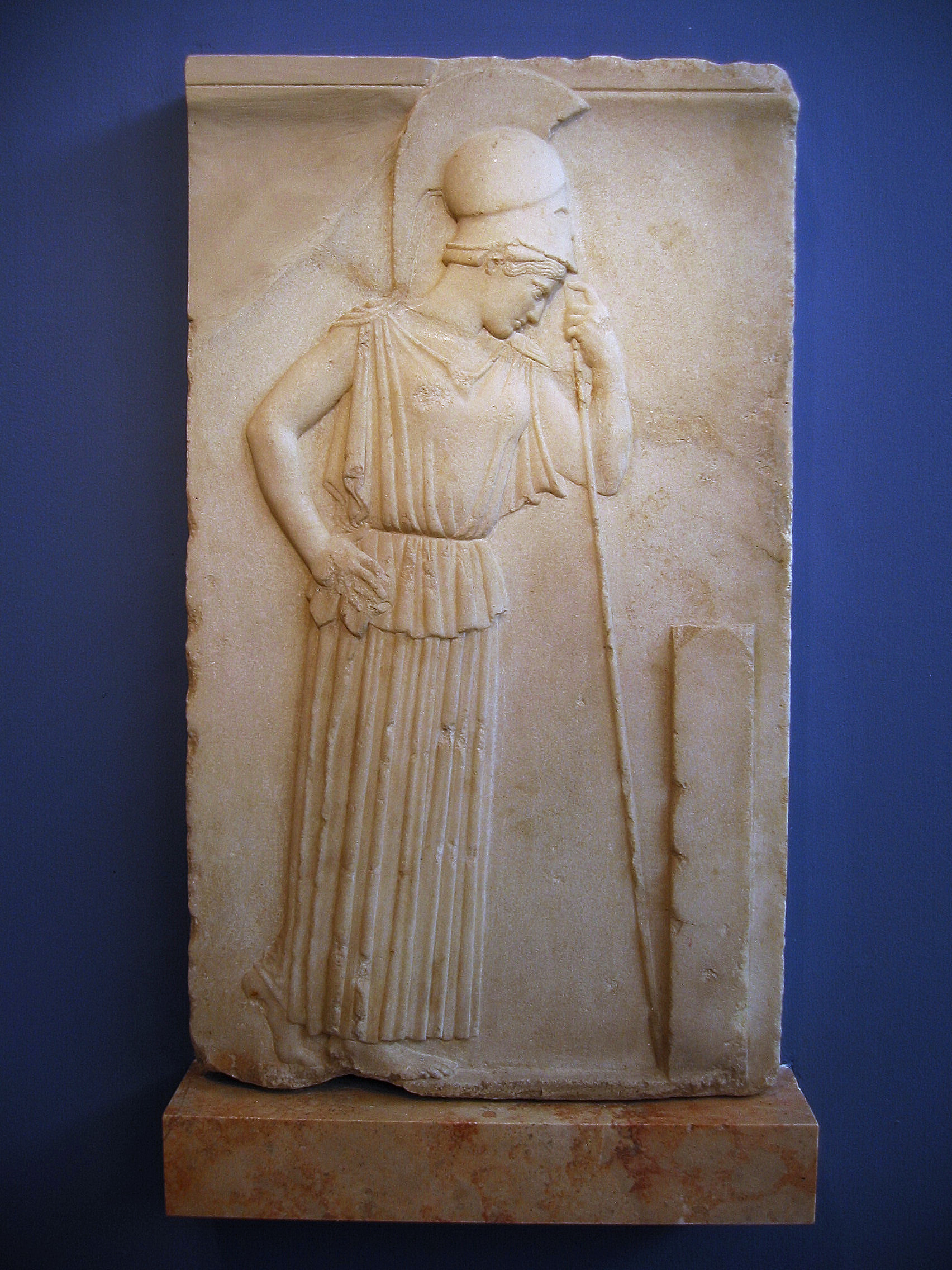
The Mourning Athena relief with Athena wearing a peplos, c. 460 BC

A peplos (Ancient Greek: πέπλος) is a body-length garment established as typical attire for women in ancient Greece by c. 500 BC, during the late Archaic and Classical period. The peplos was a rectangular piece of woollen cloth that was folded loosely down one side (leaving the garment open down the other side) and pinned at both shoulders, then allowed to drape down around the body. The top third of the cloth could also be folded over to create an over-fold, called the apoptygma (ἀπόπτυγμα), with the shoulder fastenings at the top of this fold. A girdle or belt was used to fasten the garment at the waist and create another fold, to adjust its length for the height of the wearer. Variations of the peplos were worn by women in many periods such as the archaic, early classical, and classical periods of ancient Greece.

It may be compared with the Ionic chiton, which was a piece of fabric folded over and sewn together along the longer side to form a tube.

Spartan women continued to wear the peplos much later in history than in other Greek cultures. Theirs was shorter than fashionable in the rest of Greece and with slits on the side.

== Rituals ==
Guide to the wearing of a peplos, from Carl Heinrich Stratz's Die Frauenkleidung und ihre natürliche Entwicklung (1904)

On the last day of the month Pyanepsion the priestess of Athena Polias and the Arrephoroi, a group of girls chosen to help in the making of the sacred peplos, set up the loom on which the enormous peplos was to be woven by the Ergastinai, another group of girls chosen to spend about nine months making the sacred peplos. They had to weave a theme of Athena's defeat of Enkelados and the Olympian's defeat of the Giants. The peplos of the statue was changed each year during the Plynteria.

The peplos played a role in the Athenian festival of the Great Panathenaea. Nine months before the festival, at the arts and crafts festival entitled Chalkeia, young women began to weave a special peplos. During the Panathenaea the peplos was taken up to the Acropolis of Athens to be presented to the wooden statue of Athena Polias in the Erechtheion, opposite the Parthenon. The main scene of the Parthenon frieze is believed, although not without disagreement, to represent this peplos scene during the Panathenaea. The peplos had images of the mythic battle between gods and giants woven into its material and usually consisted of purple and saffron-yellow cloth.

== Gallery ==
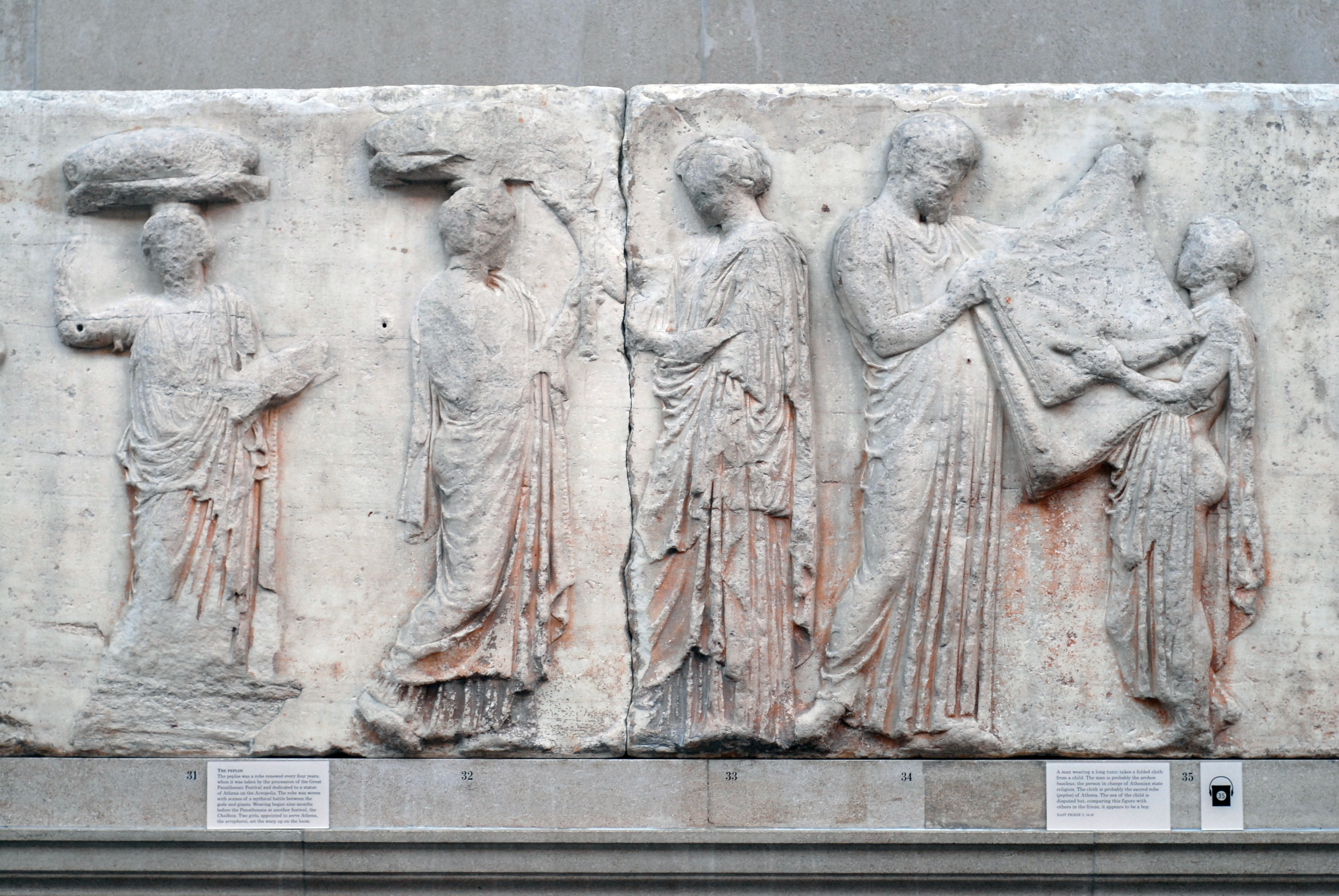
The Panathenaea peplos, from the Parthenon frieze

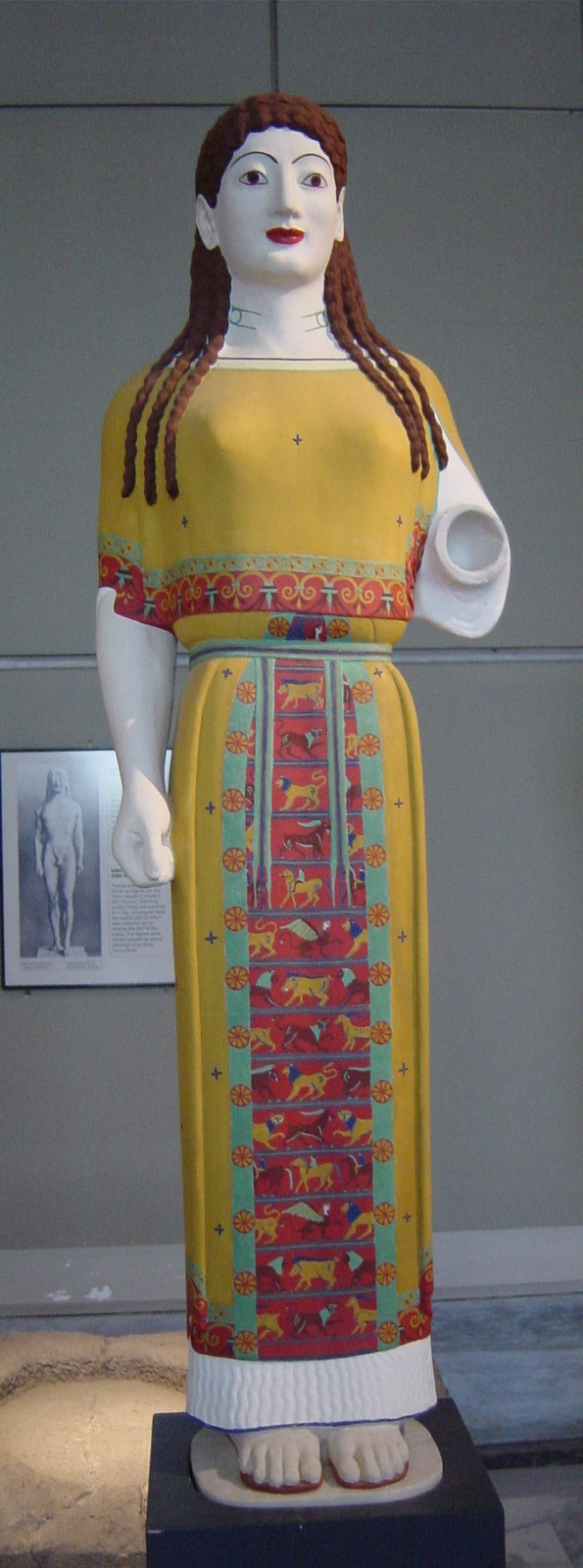
The Peplos Kore, colour reconstruction of statue of c. 530 BC

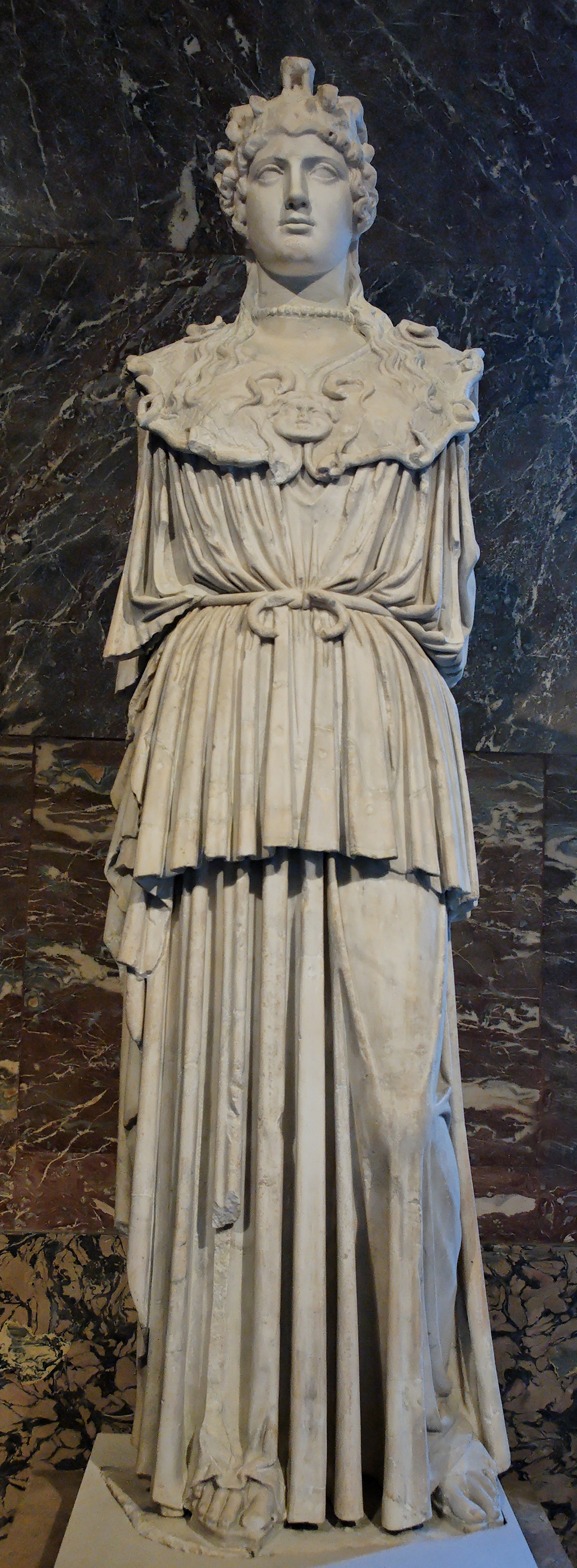
Athena wearing a luxurious peplos, one that uses a lot of fabric, fifth century BC

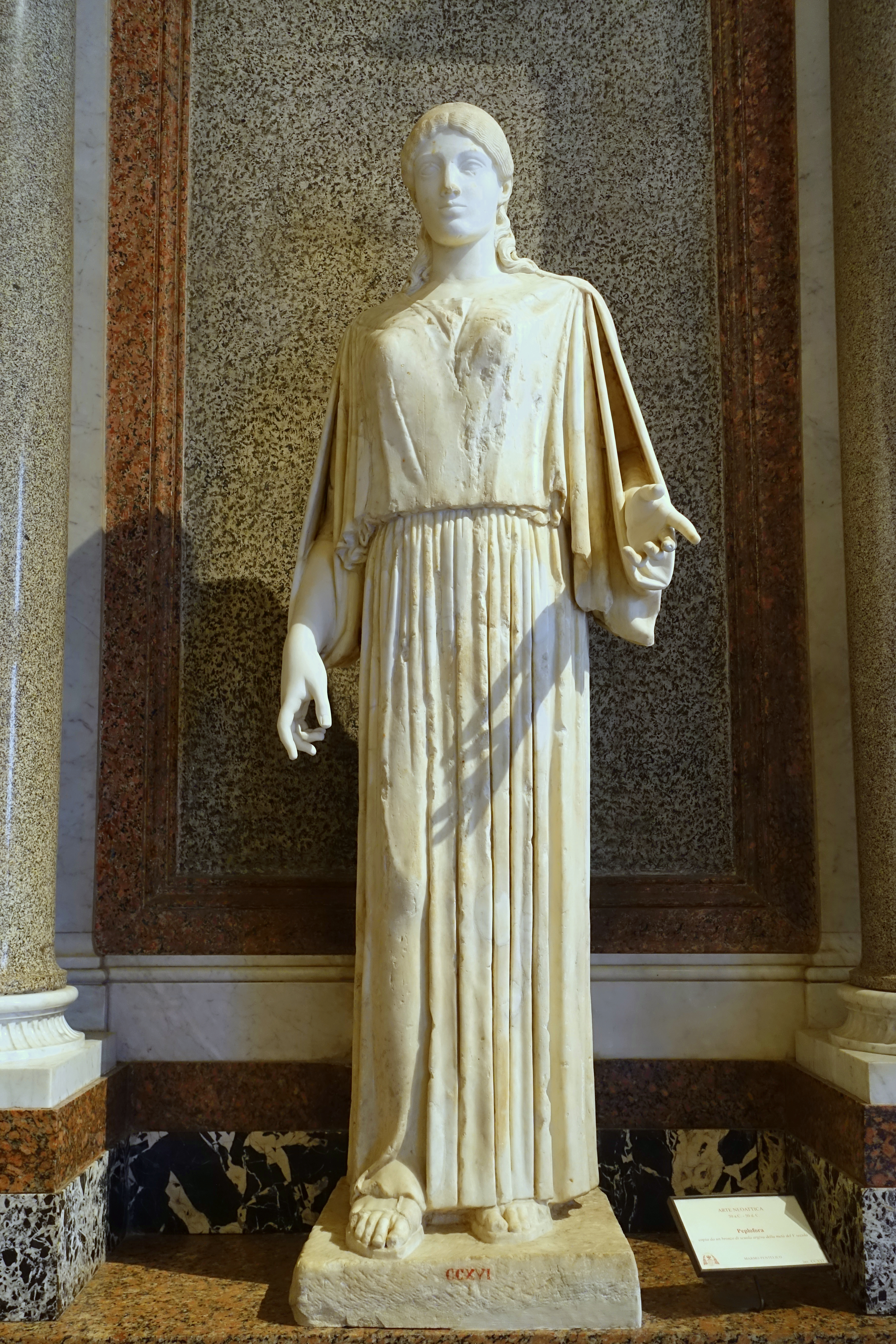
A wide peplos with the width gathered at the side to be used as sleeves

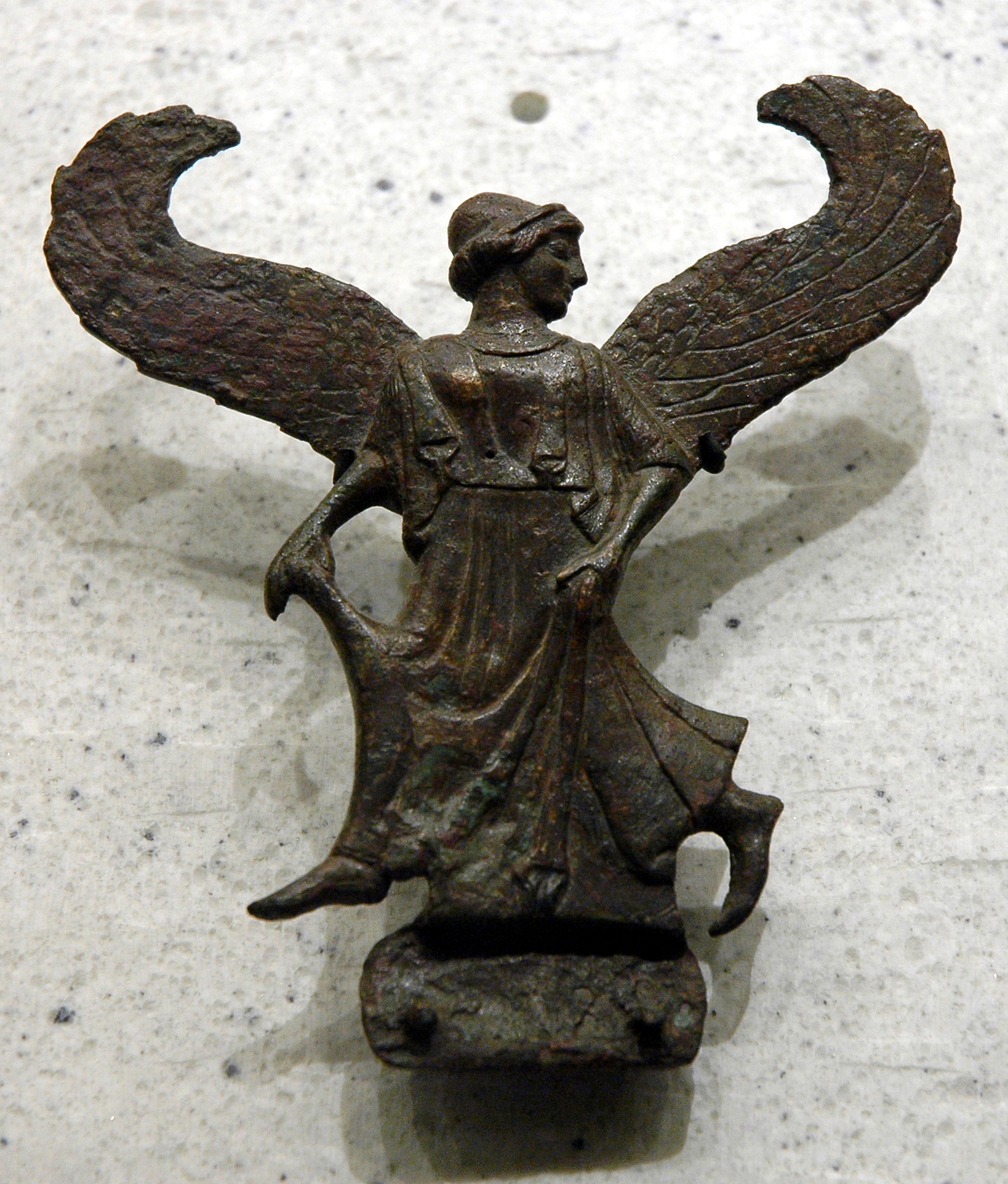
Nike wearing a peplos on top of a chiton, second quarter of fifth century BC

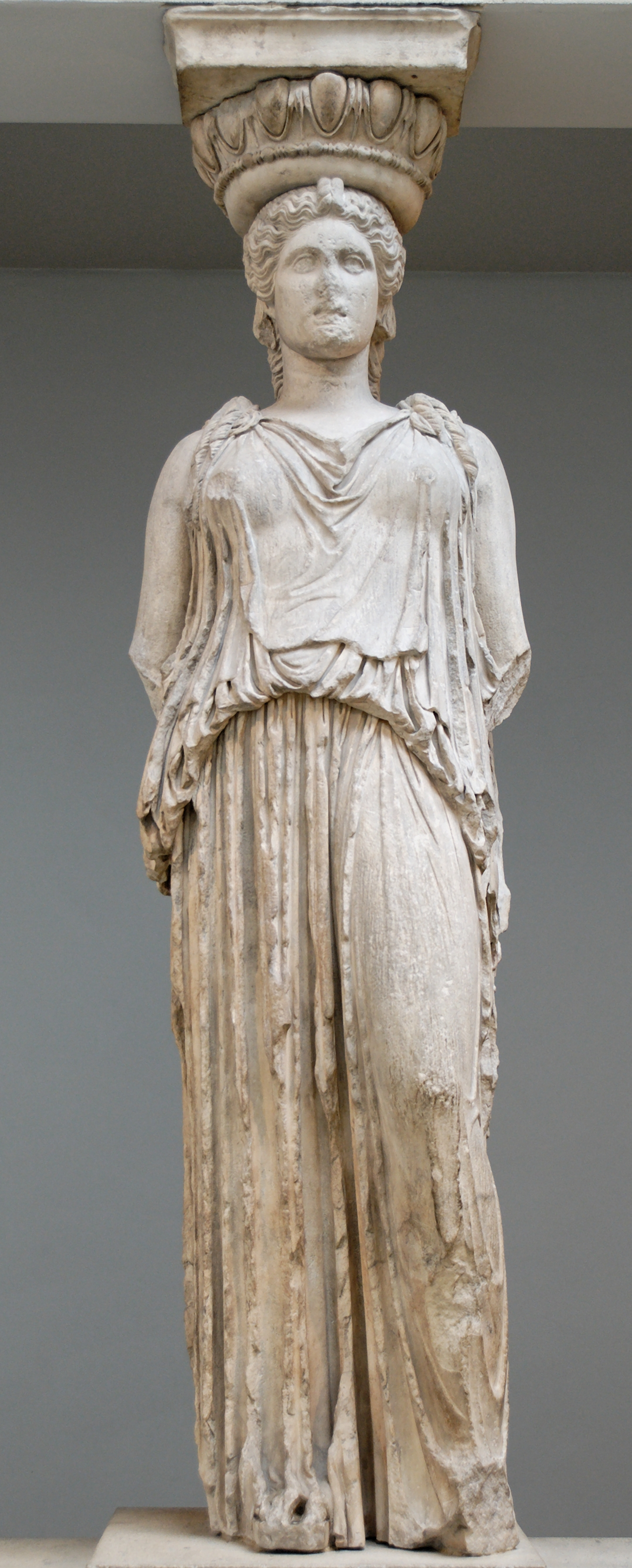
Caryatid from the Erechtheion wearing a peplos. Note the blousing, or kolpos, over the zone

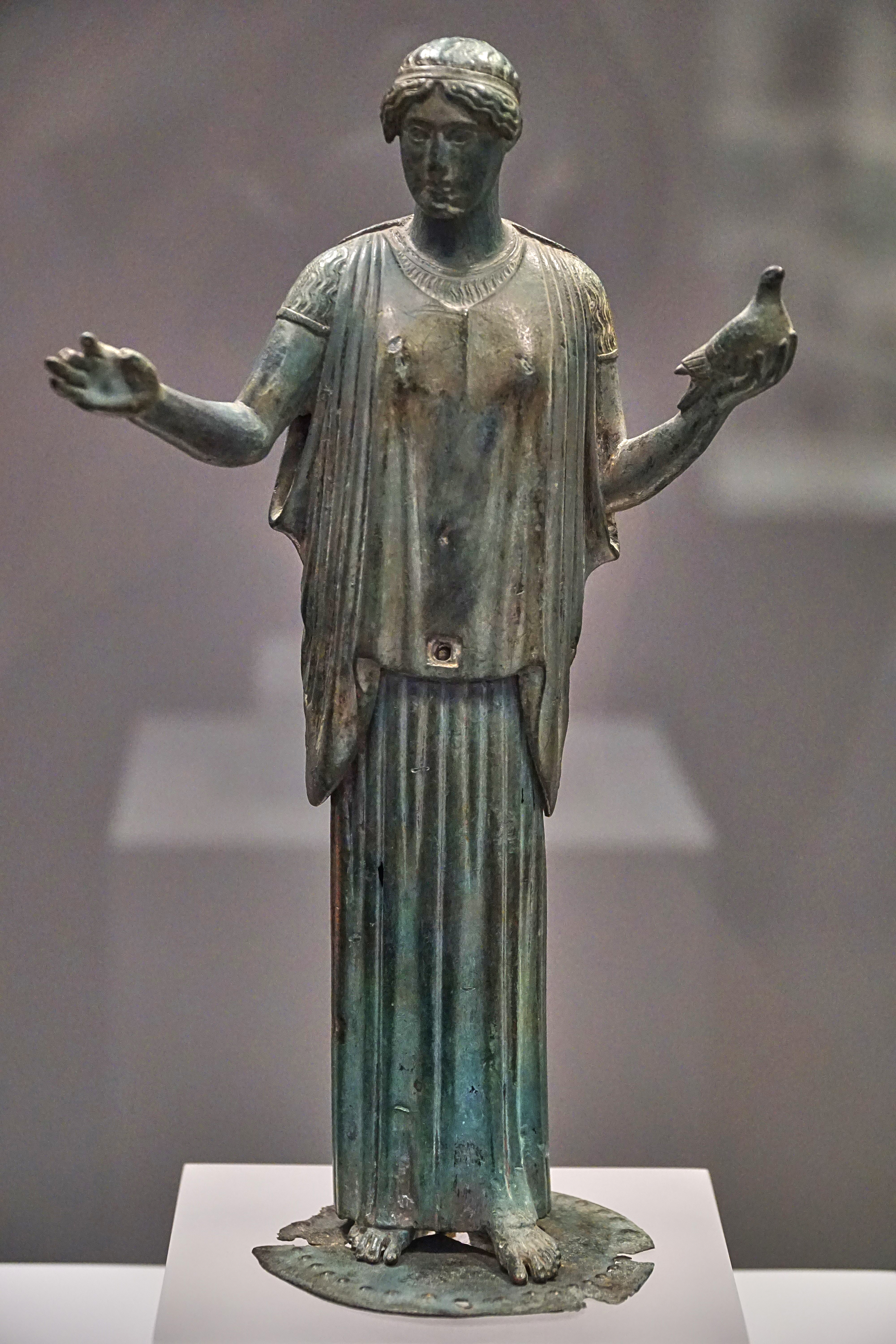
Wearing a peplos over a chiton, (fifth century BC)

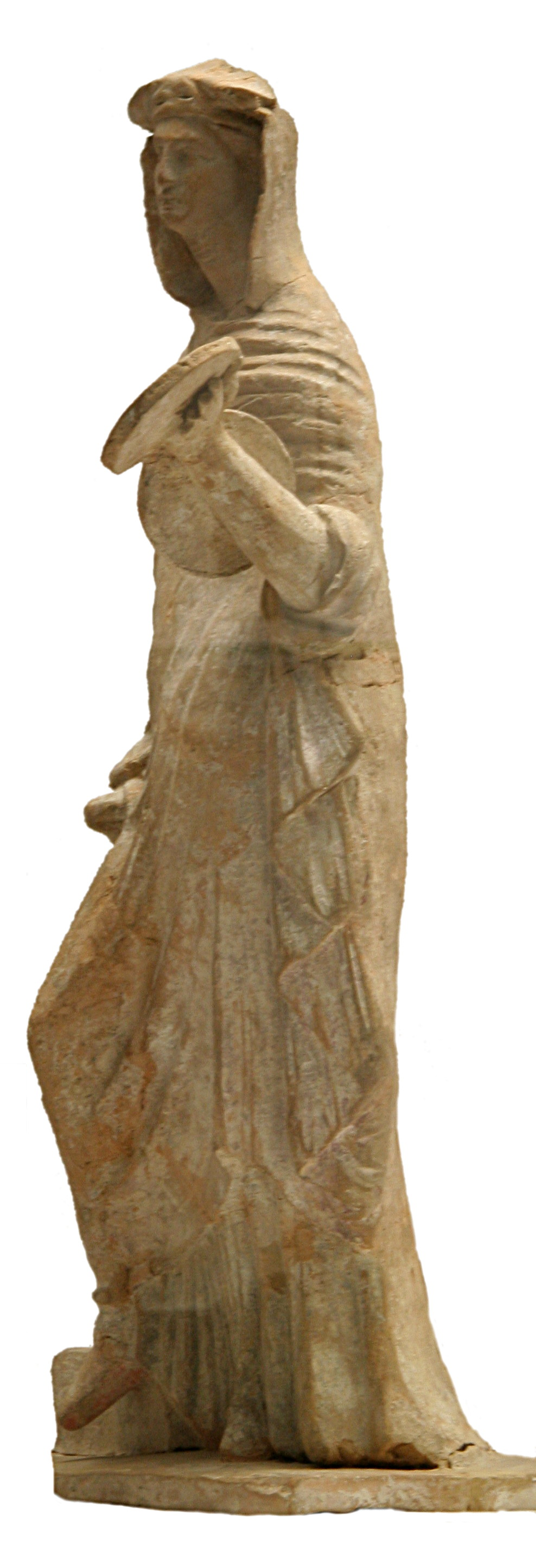
Woman wearing the fold of her peplos over her head, second century BC

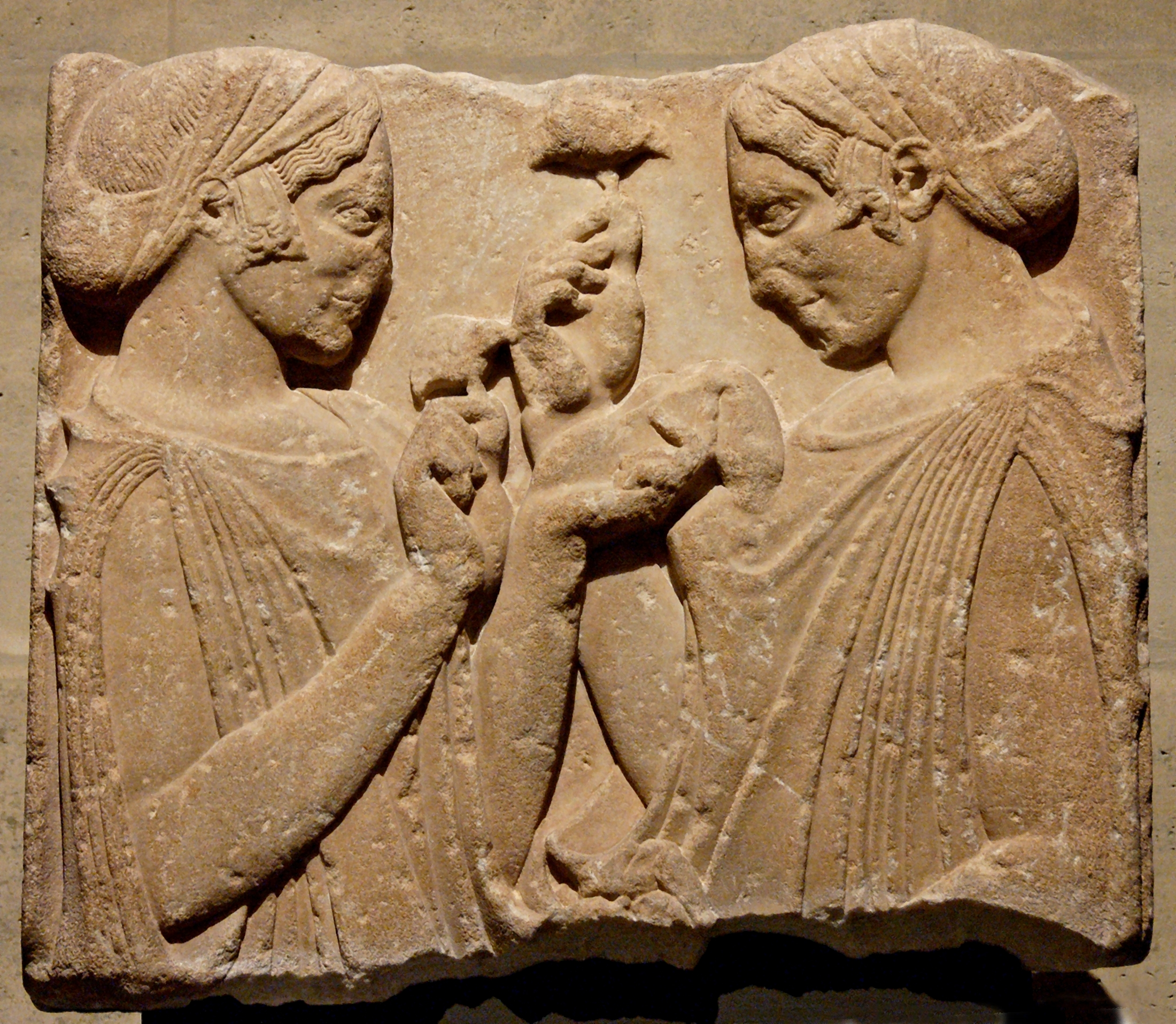
"Exaltation de la Fleur" (exaltation of the flower), fragments from a secondary grave stele: two women wearing a peplos and kekryphalos (hairnet), hold poppy or pomegranate flowers, and maybe a small bag of seeds. Parian marble, c. 470–460 BC. From Pharsalos, Thessaly.

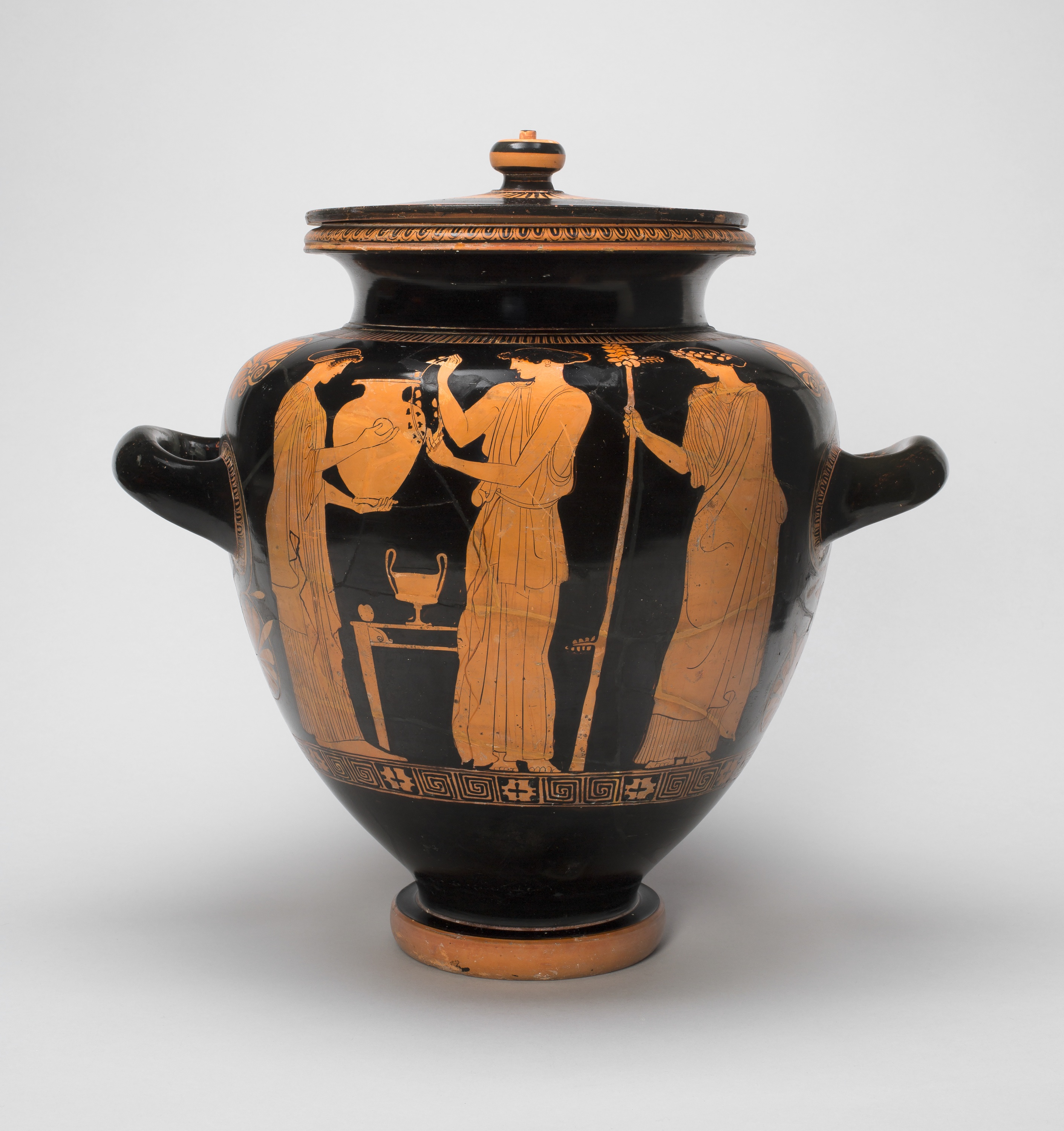
Vase showing young woman in a peplos (centre), accompanied on either side by women wearing chitons and himations, c. 450 BC.

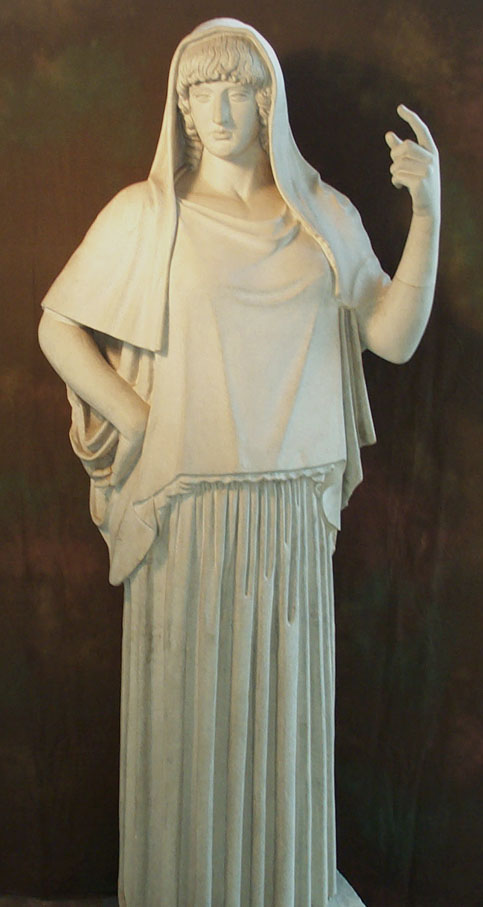
The Hestia Giustiniani, a Roman probable copy in marble of Greek bronze of c. 450 BC, wearing a peplos and a veil
Peplos in Roman sculptures from Herculaneum, before 79 CE
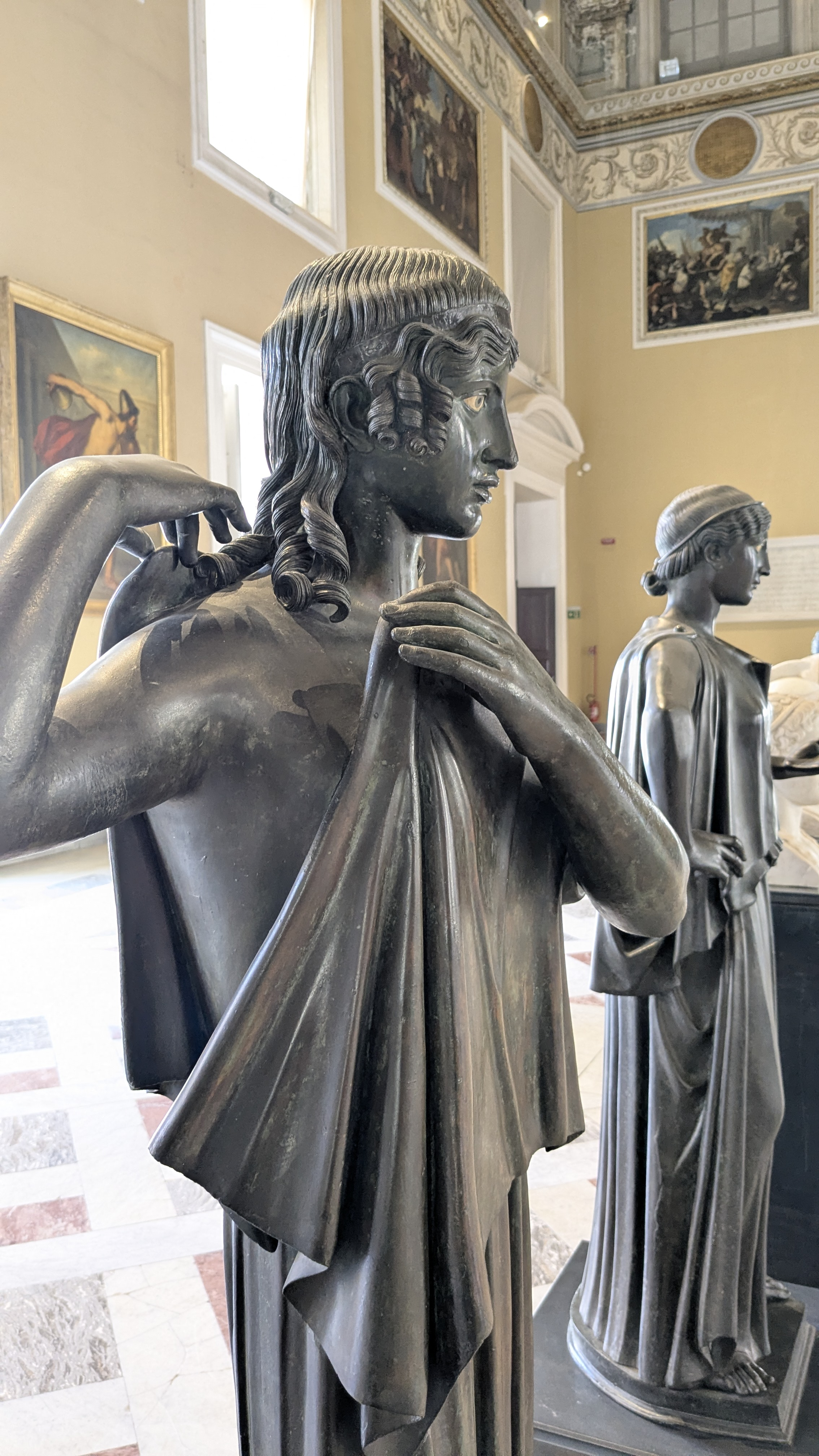
Fastening a peplos

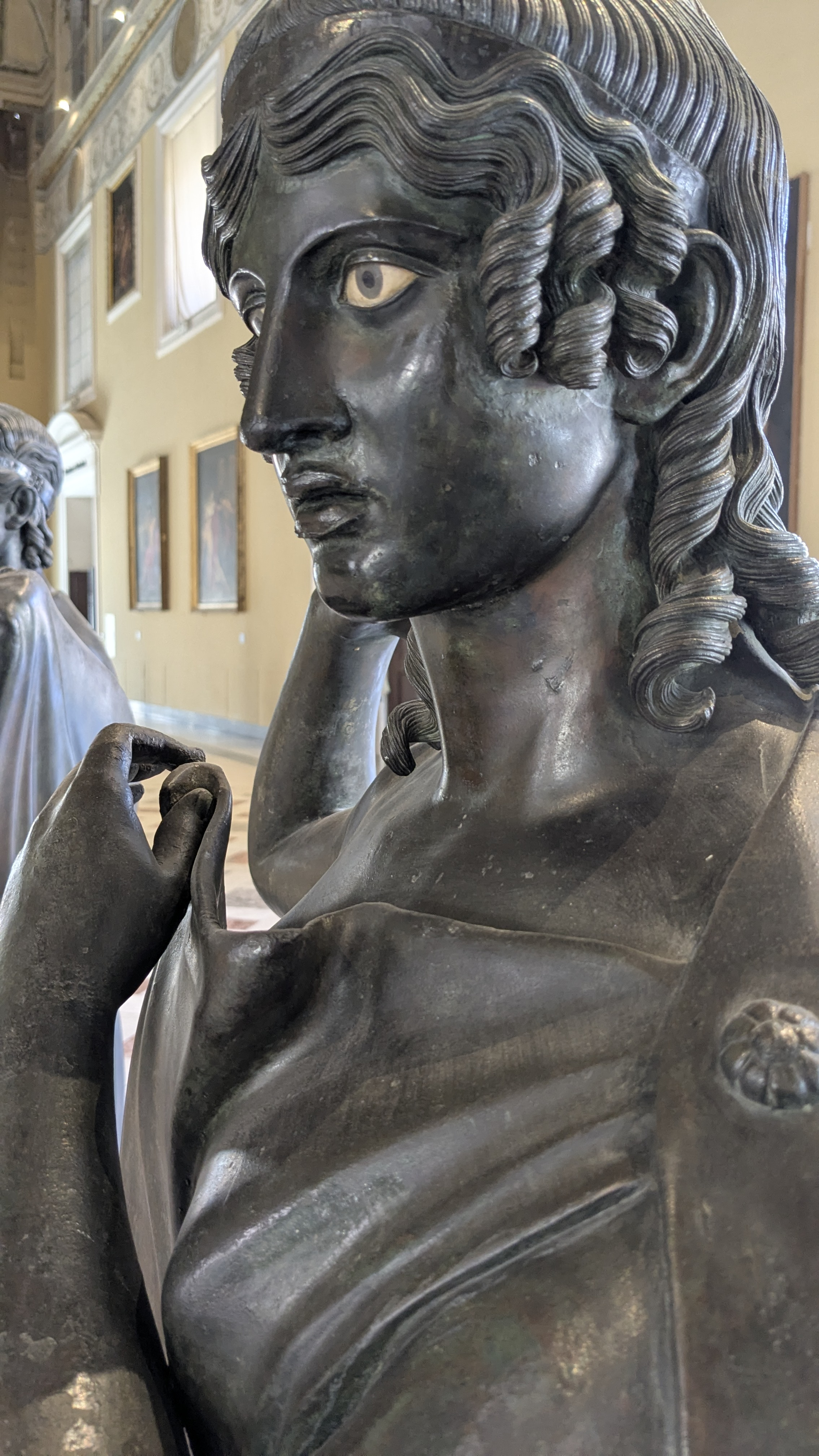
Detail of fastening mechanism

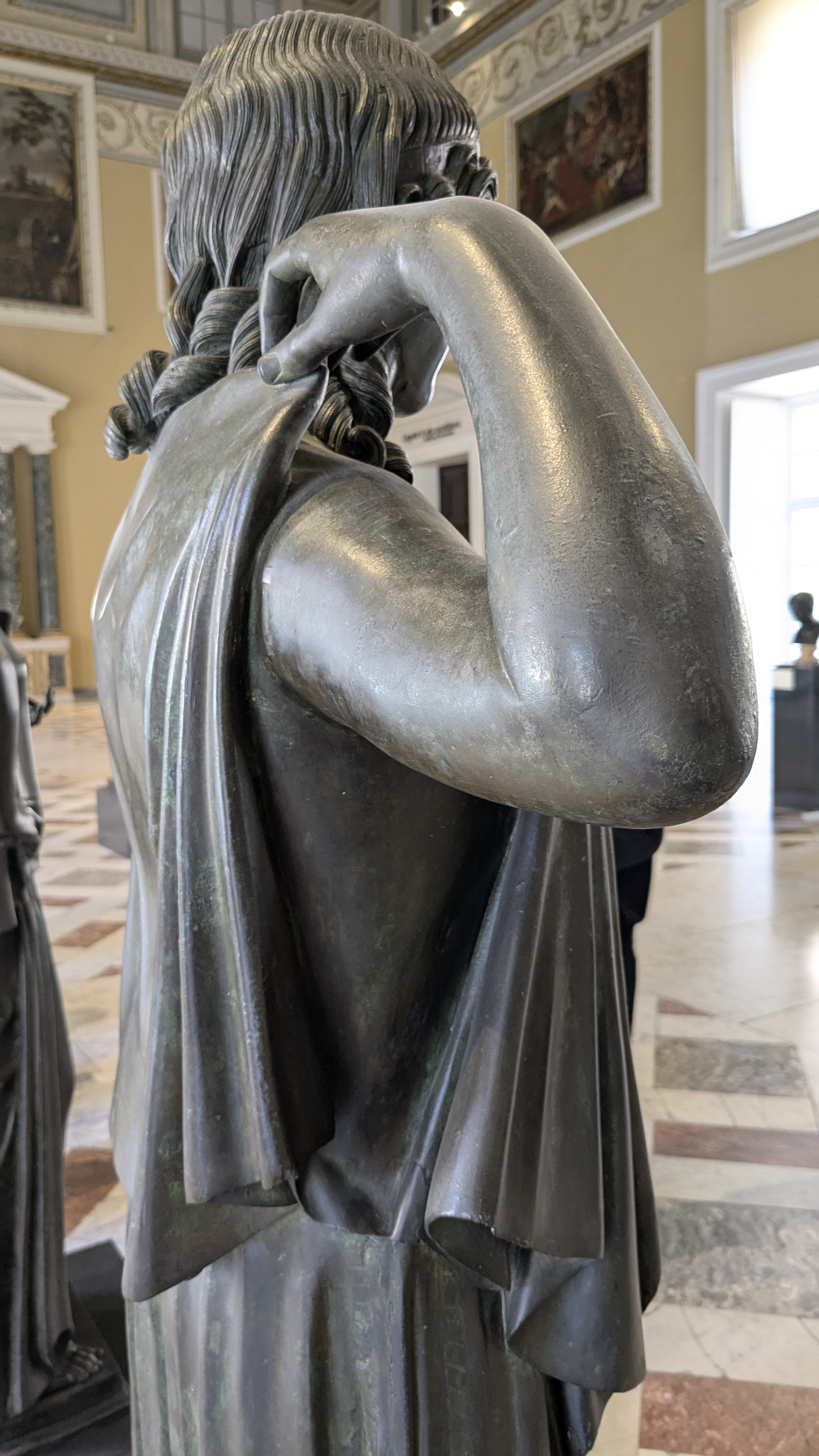
Side view

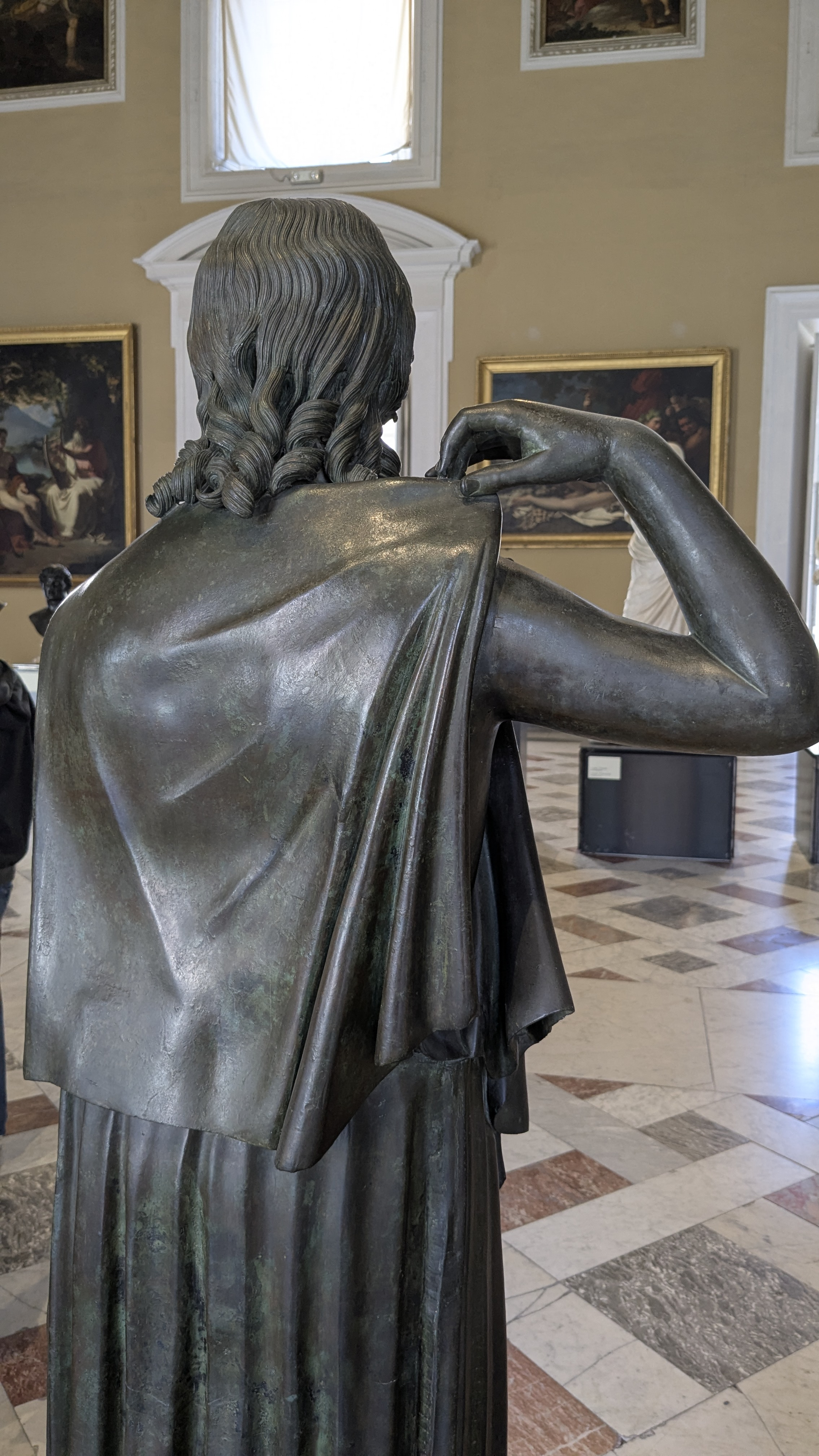
Rear view, showing the apoptygma

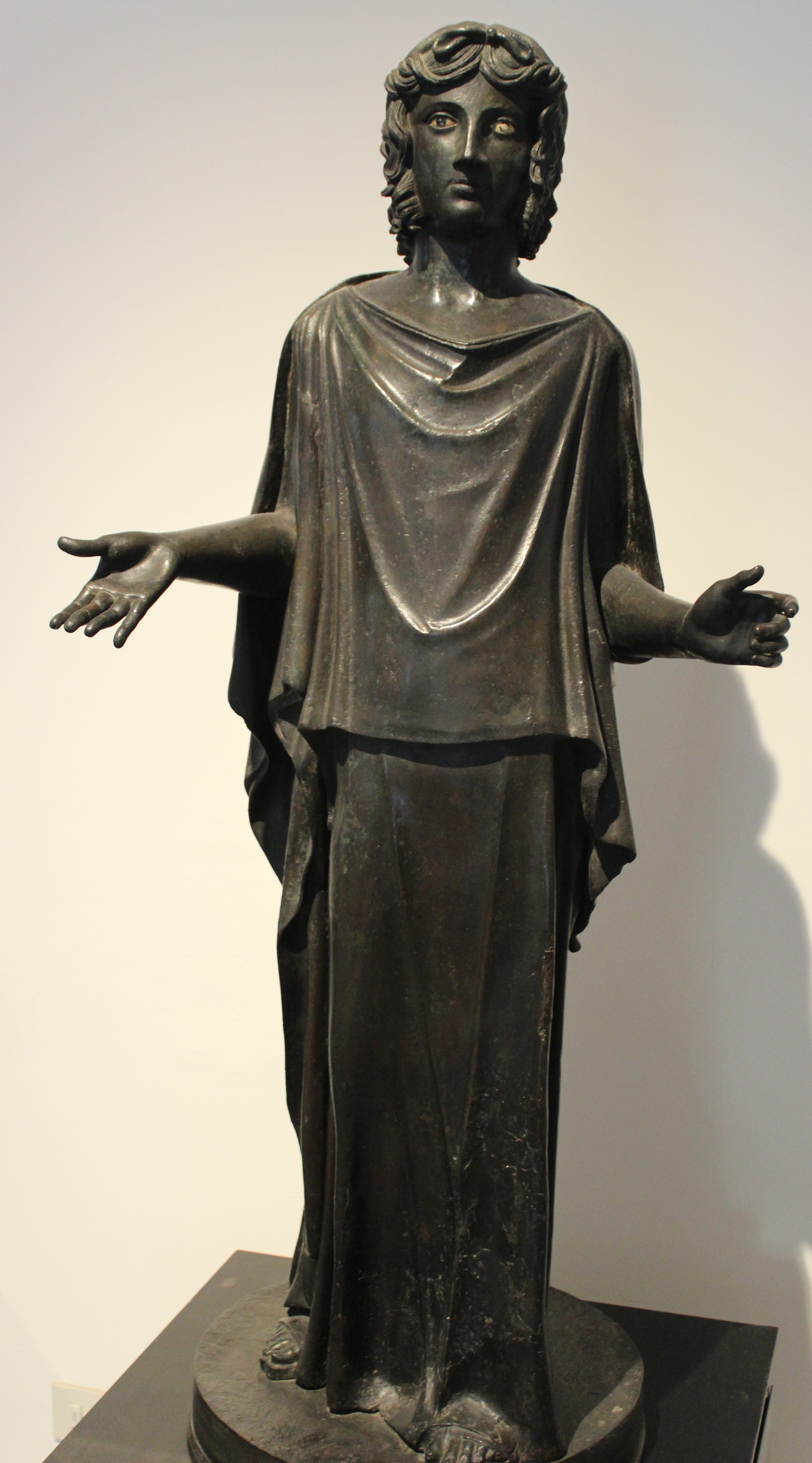
Fastened

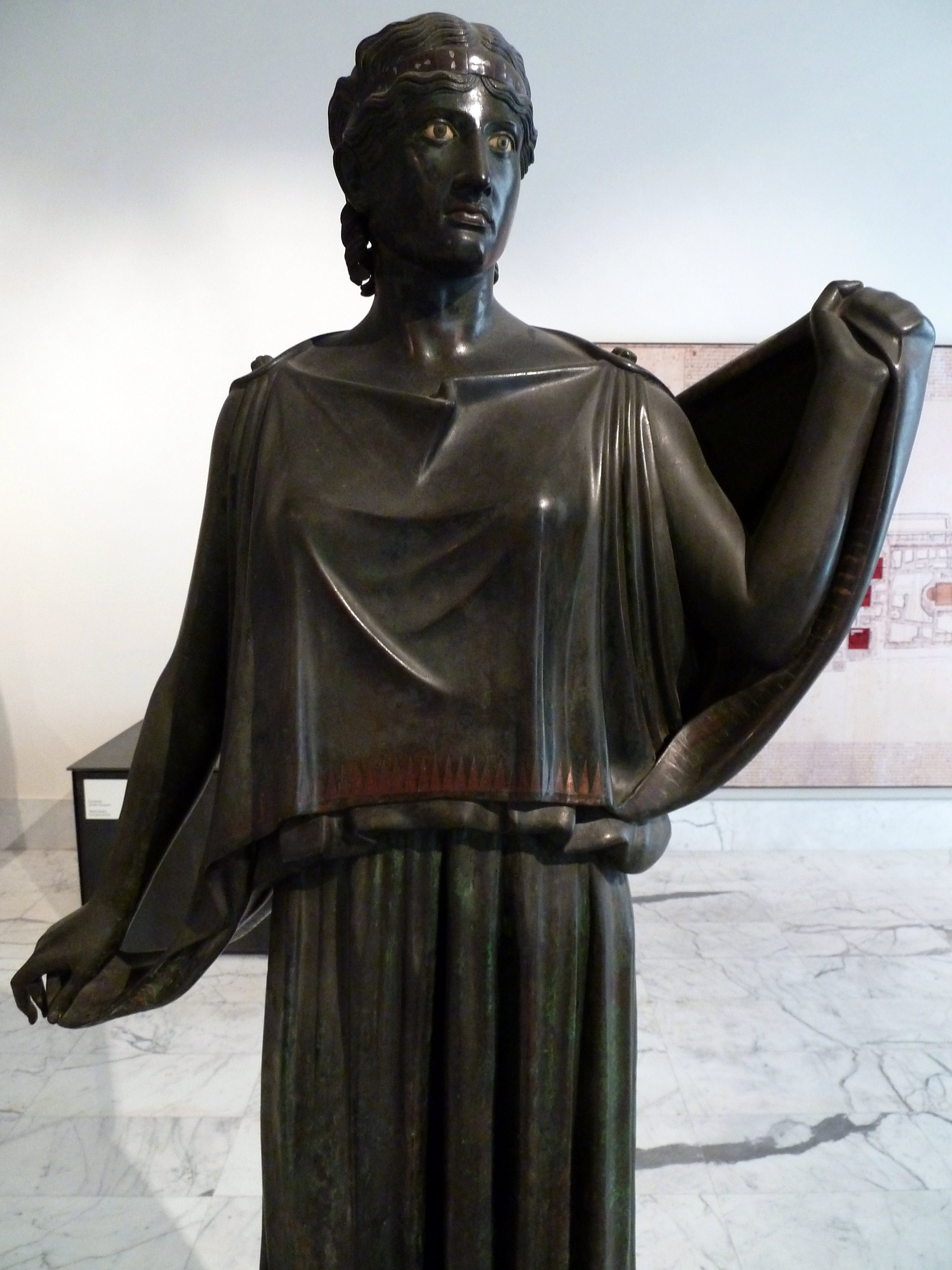
Pulling it over the head. Remnants of a red border may be visible.

Giustiniani Hestia

== See also ==
- Clothing in ancient Greece
- Clothing in the ancient world
- Delphos gown – Type of pleated woman's dress designed 1907
