= Parthenon Frieze =

Sculpture from the Parthenon in Athens

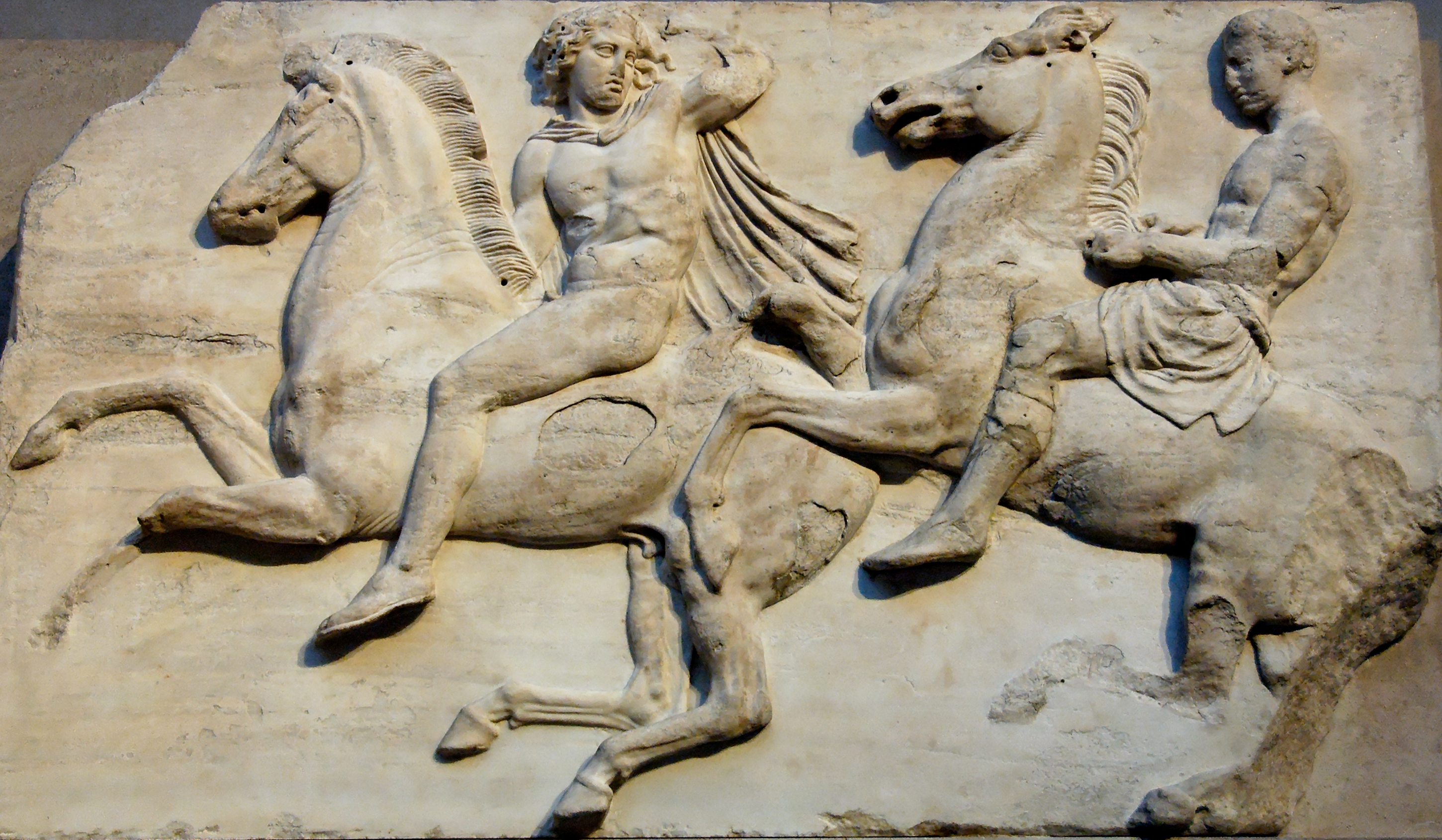
Cavalry from the Parthenon Frieze, West II, 2–3, British Museum

The Parthenon Frieze is the low-relief Pentelic marble sculpture created to adorn the upper part of the Parthenon's naos.

It was sculpted between c. 443 and 437 BC, most likely under the direction of Phidias. Of the 160 meters (524 ft) of the original frieze, 128 meters (420 ft) survives—some 80 percent. The rest is known only from the drawings attributed to French artist Jacques Carrey in 1674, thirteen years before the Venetian bombardment that ruined the temple. Along with the 64 Metopes of the Parthenon and 28 figures Pediments of the Parthenon, it forms the bulk of surviving sculpture from the building.

All of the frieze has been removed from the Parthenon.

56 blocks of the frieze are at the British Museum in London (forming the major part of the Elgin Marbles); 40 blocks are in the Acropolis Museum in Athens, and the remainder of fragments shared between six other institutions. Casts of the frieze may be found in the Beazley archive at the Ashmolean Museum at Oxford, at the Spurlock Museum in Urbana, in the Skulpturhalle at Basel and elsewhere. The part of the frieze in London has been claimed by Greece, and British and Greek authorities are discussing its future. On March 24, 2023, a relief fragment of a young man from "Block 5" of the frieze was repatriated to the Acropolis Museum from the Vatican Museums.

== Construction ==
Annotated sectional view of the Parthenon with parts in the British Museum shaded

Plutarch's Life of Pericles, 13.4–9, informs us "the man who directed all the projects and was overseer [episkopos] for him [Pericles] was Phidias... Almost everything was under his supervision, and, as we have said, he was in charge, owing to his friendship with Perikles, of all the other artists". The description was not architekton, the term usually given to the creative influence behind a building project, rather episkopos. But it is from this claim, the circumstantial evidence of Phidias's known work on the Athena Parthenos and his central role in the Periclean building programme that he is attributed authorship of the frieze. The frieze consists of 378 figures and 245 animals. It was 160 meters (524 ft) in length when complete, as well as 1 meter in height, and it projects 5.6 cm forward at its maximum depth. It is composed of 114 blocks of an average 1.22 meters in length, depicting two parallel files in procession. It was a particular novelty of the Parthenon that the cella carries an Ionic frieze over the hexastyle pronaos rather than Doric metopes, as would have been expected of a Doric temple. Judging by the existence of regulae and guttae below the frieze on the east wall this was an innovation introduced late in the building process and replaced the ten metopes and triglyphs that might otherwise have been placed there.

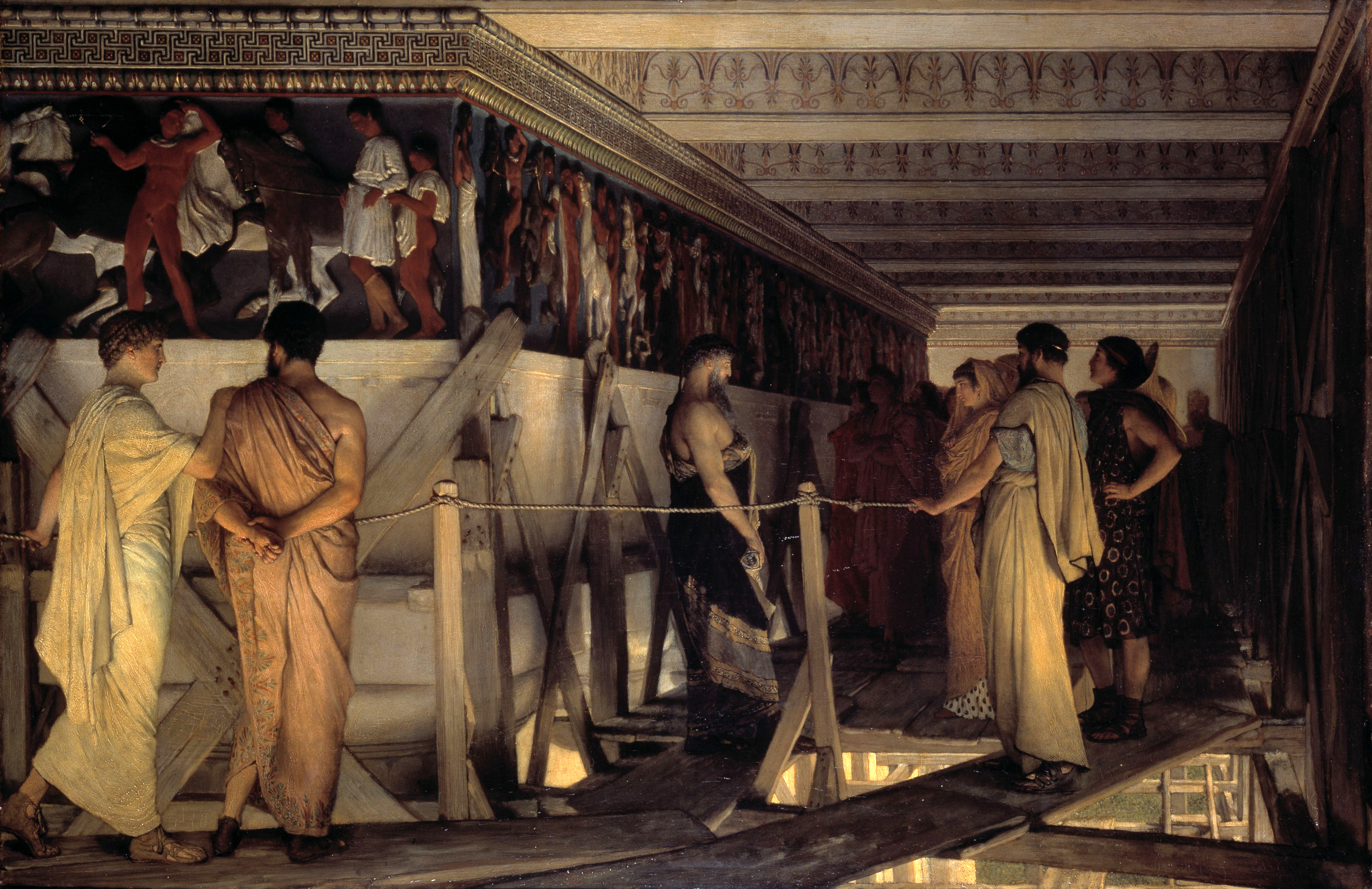
Lawrence Alma-Tadema's 1868 Phidias Showing the Frieze of the Parthenon to his Friends, reflecting contemporary reconstructions of the frieze's colour

The marble was quarried from Mount Pentelicus and transported 19 km to the acropolis of Athens. A persistent question has been whether it was carved in situ. Just below the moulding and above the tenia there is a channel 17 mm high that would have served to give access to the sculptor's chisel when finishing the heads or feet on the relief; this scamillus or guide strip is the best evidence there is that the blocks were carved on the wall. Additionally, on practical grounds it is easier to move a sculptor than a sculpture, and to use a crowbar to put them into place, potentially, could have chipped the edges. No information is recoverable on the workshop, but estimates range from three to 80 sculptors on the basis of style. However, American archeologist Jenifer Neils suggests nine, on the grounds that this would be the least number necessary to produce the work in the time given. It was finished with metal detailing and painted. No colour, however, survives, but perhaps the background was blue, judging by comparison with grave stelae and the paint remnants on the frieze of the Hephaisteion. Possibly figures held objects that were also rendered in paint such as Poseidon's trident and the laurel in Apollo's hand. The many drill holes found in Hera's and Apollo's heads indicate that a gilded bronze wreath would probably have crowned the deities.

The system of numbering the frieze blocks dates back to Adolf Michaelis's 1871 work Der Parthenon, and since then Ian Jenkins has revised this scheme in the light of recent discoveries. The convention, here preserved, is that blocks are numbered in Roman and figures in Arabic numerals, the figures are numbered left to right against the direction of the procession on the north and west and with it on the south.

== Description ==
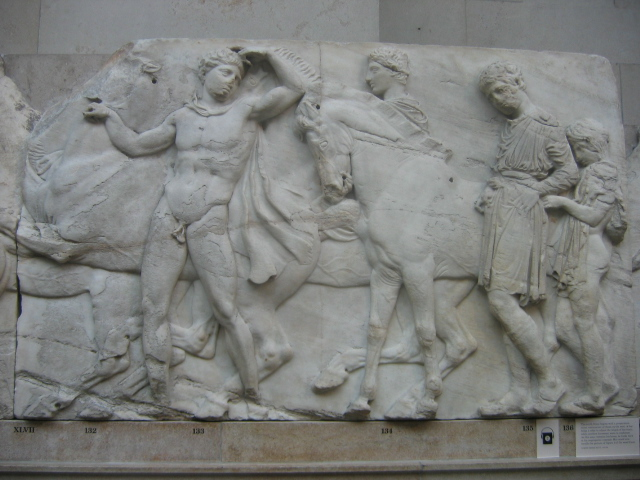
West frieze, XLVII, 132–136, British Museum

The narrative of the frieze begins at the southwest corner where the procession appears to divide into two separate files. The first third of the west frieze is not part of the procession, but instead, seems to be the preparatory stages for the participants. The first figure here is a marshal dressing, W30, followed by several men preparing the horses W28–23 until figure W22 who, it has been suggested, may be engaged in the dokimasia, the tryout or enrollment of the knights. W24 is an ambiguous figure who might be either the protesting owner of a rejected horse or a keryx (herald) whose hand held part of an otherwise lost salpinx (trumpet), but either way this point marks the beginning of the procession proper.

The following ranks W21–1 along with N75–136 and S1–61 are all of horsemen and constitute 46% of the whole frieze. They are divided into two lines of ten ranks – the same number as that of the Attic tribes. All figures are beardless youths with the exception of two, W8 and W15, who along with S2–7 wear Thracian dress of fur cap, a patterned cloak, and high boots; these have been identified by Martin Robertson as hipparchs. Next are the four-horse chariots, each with charioteer and armed passenger, there are ten on the south frieze and eleven on the north. Since these passengers are sometimes depicted as dismounting they may be taken to represent the apobatai, participants in the ceremonial race found in Attica and Boeotia.

By N42 and S89 the equestrian parade is at an end, and the following 16 figures on the north and 18 on the south are taken to be the elders of Athens judging by their braided hair, an attribute of distinguished age in Classical art. Four of these figures raise their right hand in a clenched fist gesture suggestive of a pose associated with the thallophoroi (olive branch bearers) who were older men chosen in competition for their good looks alone. No drill holes, however, exist for any branch to be inserted in their hands. Next in line (S107–114, N20–28) are the musicians: four kithara (a variant of the lyre) and four aulos (flute) players. N16–19 and S115–118 (conjectured) perhaps, as hydriaphoroi, the water-vessel carriers, here men, rather than metic girls mentioned in the literature on the Panathenaia. N13–15, S119–121 are the skaphephoroi, the tray bearers of the honeycombs and cakes used to entice the sacrificial animals to the altar. N1–12, S122–149 are the four cows and four sheep on the north and ten cows on the south meant for sacrifice on the acropolis, presumably an abbreviated form of the hecatomb usually offered on this occasion – there is an a-b-a rhythm of placid and restive cows.

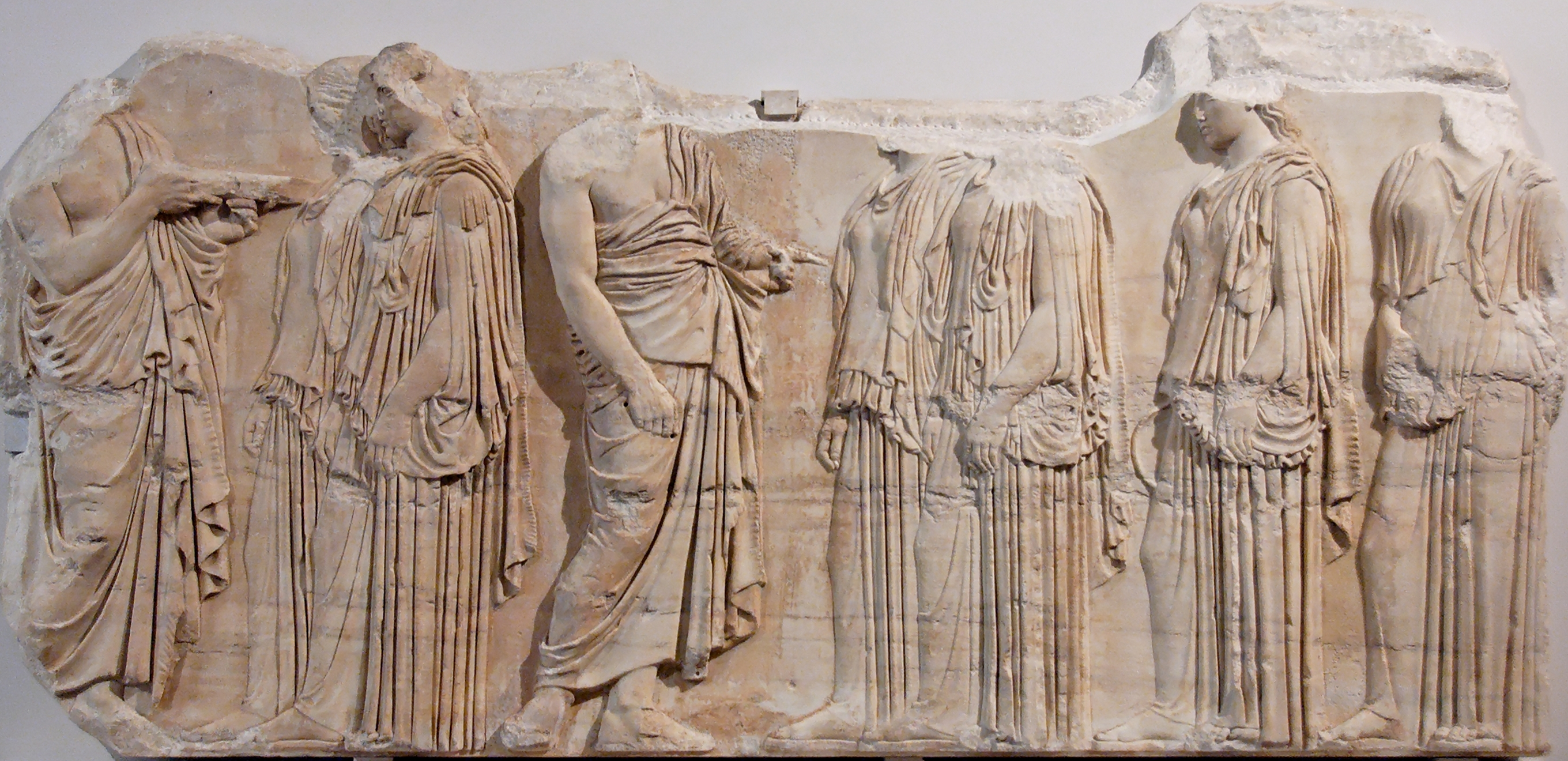
Weavers section of the frieze, East VII, 49–56, Louvre, (MR 825)

As the files converge on the east frieze we encounter the first women celebrants E2–27, E50–51, E53–63. The priestesses carry the sacrificial instruments and paraphernalia including the phiale (phial or jug), oinochoai (wine jars), thymiaterion (incense burner), and in the case of E50–51, evidently they have just handed the marshal E49 a kanoun, making the girl the kanephoros. The next groups E18–23, E43–46, are problematic. Six on the left and four on the right, if one does not count two other figures who may or may not be marshals, then this group might be taken to be the ten eponymous heroes who gave their names to the ten tribes. Their proximity to the deities indicates their importance, but selecting differently, then nine of them may be the archons of the polis or athlothetai officials who managed the procession; there is insufficient iconographic evidence to determine which interpretation is correct.

Interpretations of the figures varies. The twelve seated deities are taken to be the Olympians, they are one third taller than any other figure on the frieze and are arranged in two groups of six on diphroi (backless) stools, common forms of ancient furniture, with the exception of Zeus who is enthroned. Their backs are turned to what must be the culminating event of the procession E31–35; five figures (three children and two adults, and although badly corroded, the two children on the left appear to be girls bearing objects on their heads, while a third, perhaps a boy, assisting an adult who may be the archon basileus, in folding a piece of cloth. This frieze often is interpreted as the presentation of Athena's peplos, perhaps by the arrhephoroi, but debate exists regarding who the figures represent more than what ritual is represented.

== Style ==
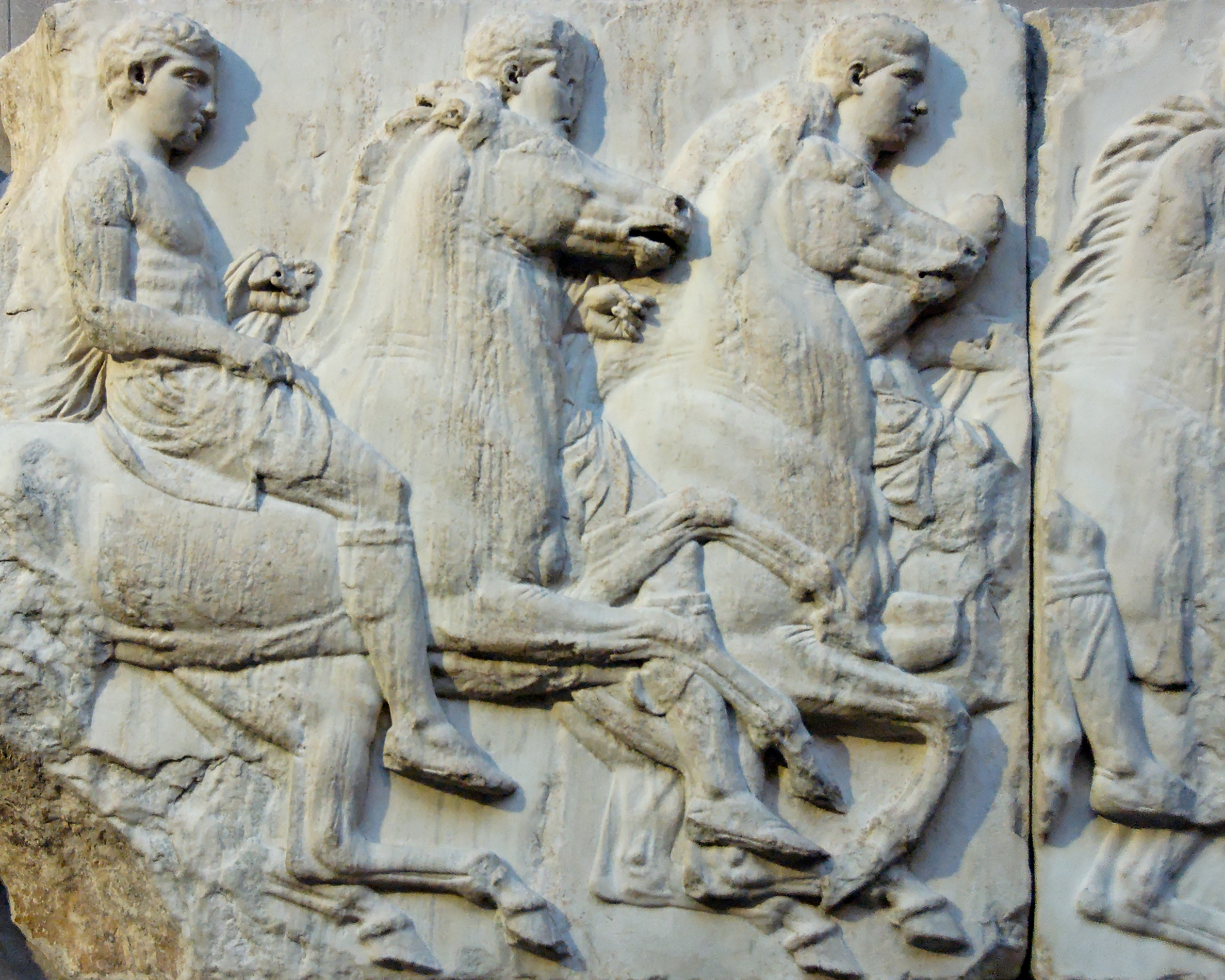
Cavalcade south frieze, X XI, 26–28, British Museum

The Parthenon Frieze is the defining monument of the High Classical style of Attic sculpture. It stands between the gradual eclipse of the Severe style, as witnessed on the Parthenon metopes, and the evolution of the Late Classical Rich style, exemplified by the Nike balustrade. What sources the designer of the frieze drew upon is difficult to gauge, certainly large scale narrative art was familiar to 5th-century Athenians as in the Stoa poikile painting by Polygnotos of Thasos. While there is an overall coherence to the work there are design differences on opposing sides of the frieze that has suggested to some scholars the possibility of more than one designer and a pattern of influence amongst them. There is greater nudity and frontally on the north than the south, the massing and distribution of figures is greatly different on the east than the more widely spaced west, and the east and north generally exhibit greater innovation. This evidence, along with the frequency with which Greek artists are thought to have collaborated, has led Jenifer Neils to hypothesize the existence of two designers working on the sculpture. This would admit the possibility of a later designer comparing and competing with the earlier, and so, explain the observable changes in composition. Geographical orientations also may have dictated what would be represented on one side versus another, i.e., Amazons to the west, and so forth.

This artistic period is one of discovery of the expressive possibilities of the human body; there is a greater freedom in the poses and gestures, and an increased attention to anatomical verisimilitude, as may be observed in the ponderated stances of figures W9 and W4, who partially anticipate the Doryphoros of Polykleitos. There is a noticeable ease to the physiques of the frieze compared with the stiffness of the metopes along with an eye for such subtleties as knuckle joints, veins, and the careful articulation of musculature. One important innovation of the style is the use of drapery as an expression of motion, or to suggest the body beneath; in archaic and early classical sculpture, clothing fell over the body as if it were a curtain obscuring the form below, in these sculptures there is the billowing chlamydes of the horsemen and the multi-pleated peploi of the women that lends a surface movement and tension to their otherwise, static poses. Variation in the manes of the horses has been of particular interest to some scholars attempting to discern the artistic personalities of sculptors who laboured on the frieze or perhaps, indicating deliberate representation of different regional traditions, so far this Morellian analysis has been without conclusion.

== Interpretation and conjecture ==
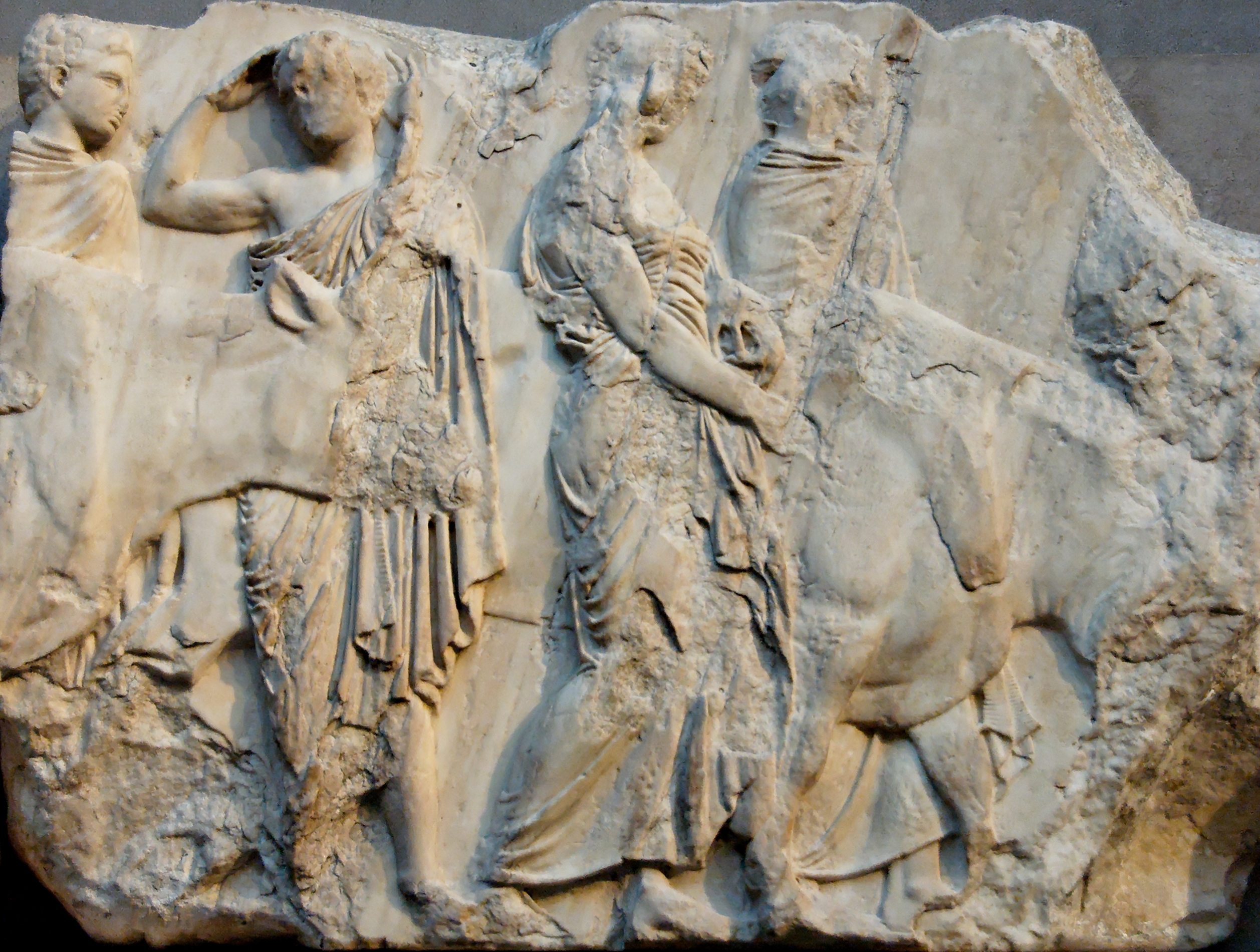
Cattle led to sacrifice, South XLV, 137–140, British Museum

As no description of the frieze survives from antiquity and many religious rituals involved secret symbolism and traditions left unspoken, the question of the meaning of the sculpture has been a persistent and unresolved one. The first published attempt at interpretation belongs to Cyriacus of Ancona in the 15th century, who referred to it as the "victories of Athens in the time of Pericles". What is now the more accepted view of the piece, however, namely that it depicts the Greater Panathenaic procession from the Leokoreion by the Dipylon Gate, to the Acropolis, was mooted by Stuart and Revett in the second volume of their Antiquities of Athens, 1787. Subsequent interpretations have built largely on this theory, even if they disallow that a temple sculpture could represent a contemporary event rather than a mythological or historical one. It has only been in recent years that an alternative thesis in which the frieze depicts the founding myth of the city of Athens instead of the festival pompe has emerged.

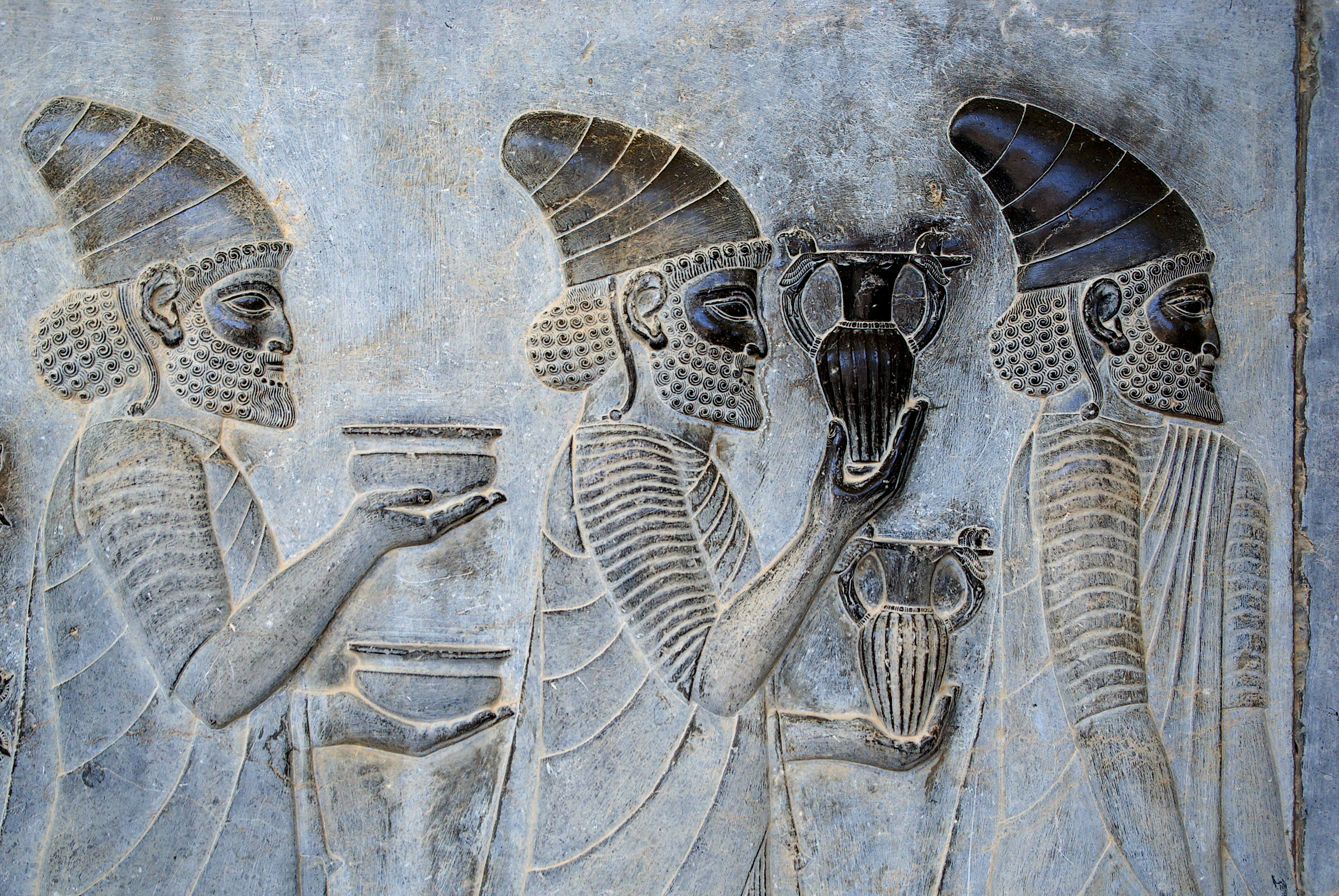
Procession of tributes from the Apadana, Persepolis, first half of the fifth century. Possibly an inspiration for the Parthenon Frieze

The contention that the scene depicts the festival for Athena is fraught with problems. Later sources indicate that a number of classes of individual who performed a role in the procession are not present in the frieze, these include: the hoplites, the allies in the Delian League, the skiaphoroi or umbrella bearers, the female hydraiphoroi (only male hydrai bearers are portrayed), the thetes, slaves, metics, the Panathenaic ship, and some would suggest the kanephoros, although there is evidence that she is accounted for. That what we now see was meant to be a generic image of the religious festival is problematic since no other temple sculpture depicts a contemporary event involving mortals. Locating the scene in mythical or historical time has been the principal difficulty of the line of inquiry. John Boardman has suggested that the cavalry portray the heroization of the Marathonomachoi, the hoplites who fell at Marathon in 490, and that, therefore these riders were the Athenians who took part in the last pre-war Greater Panathenaia. In support, he points out the number of horsemen, chariot passengers (but not charioteers), grooms, and marshals comes to the same as the number Herodotos gives for the Athenian dead: 192. Equally suggestive of a reference to the Persian Wars is the similarity several scholars have noted of the frieze to the Apadana sculpture in Persepolis. This has variously been posited to be democratic Athens counter-posing itself to oriental tyranny, or, aristocratic Athens emulating the Imperial East. Further to this zeitgeist argument there is J.J. Politt's contention that the frieze embodies a Periclean manifesto, which favours the cultural institutions of agones (or contests, as witnessed by the apobatai), sacrifices, and military training as well as a number of other democratic virtues. More recent scholarship pursuing this vein has made the frieze a site of ideological tension between the elite and the demos with perhaps, only the aristocracy present, and merely veiled reference to the ten tribes.

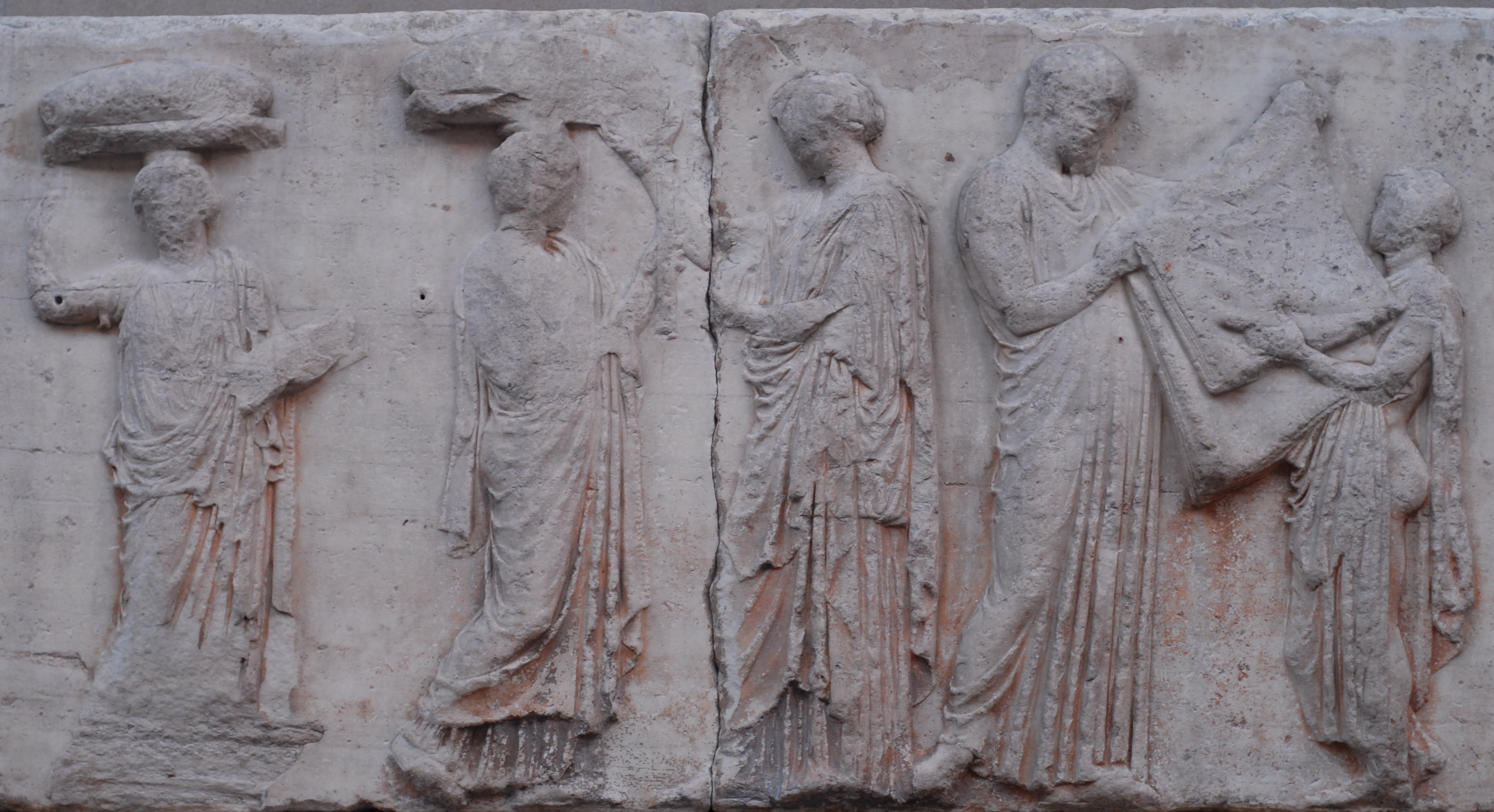
The so-called peplos scene, East V, 31–35, London

The pediments, metopes, and shield of the Parthenos all illustrate the mythological past and as the deities are observing on the east frieze, it is natural to reach for a mythological explanation. Chrysoula Kardara, has ventured that the relief shows us the first Panathenaic procession instituted under the mythical King Kekrops. This explanation would account for the absence of the allies and the ship, as these post-date the original practice of the sacrificial rite. In evidence she offers E35 as the future King Erichthonios presenting the first peplos to his predecessor Kekrops, iconographically similar to the boy's depiction on a fragmentary kylix of the 450s. A recent interpretation by Joan Breton Connelly identifies the central scene on the east frieze (hence above the door to the cella and focal point of the procession) not as the handing over of Athena's peplos by the arrhephoroi, but the donning of sacrificial garb by the daughter of King Erechtheus in preparation for the sacrifice of her life. This interpretation is suggested by the text of the fragmentary papyrus remains of Euripides's Erichtheus, wherein her life is demanded in order to save the city from Eumolpos and the Eleusinians. Thus, the deities turn their backs to prevent pollution from the sight of her death. A contentious subject in the field, Connelly's solution to the problem of meaning poses as many problems as it answers. A more recent interpretation advanced by William St Clair is that the frieze depicts the celebration of the birth of Ion, a descendant of Erechtheus. This interpretation has been rejected by Catharine Titi, who agrees with St Clair that the mood is one of celebration (rather than sacrifice) but argues that the celebration of the birth of Ion requires the presence of an infant but there is no infant on the frieze.

== Prevailing view ==
"Interpretation and conjecture″ (above) discusses challenges to the prevailing view of the frieze, most of them raised in the 20th century. This section focuses on that mainstream view, beginning with Cyriacus of Ancona's visit to the derelict Parthenon in 1436. He wrote that the marble frieze shows "the victories of Athens in the time of Pericles." His comment located the frieze's subject in a particular time and place, while also capturing both its celebratory mood and its political motivation.

In 1751, James Stuart, a British painter and architect, made drawings of the frieze, with captions under each one: "cavalcade," "charioteers," "sacrificers and oxen." At the center of the east frieze, he saw two girls carrying tray-like baskets on their heads, with similar large, oval objects in both. Stuart identified a priestess, reaching toward one basket, while two other figures hold up a folded cloth. He saw the cloth as the sacred peplos, and assumed that the frieze as a whole depicts a Panathenaic procession.

In 1816, the British parliament asked Ennio Visconti, antiquities curator at the Louvre, to advise them about acquiring "the Elgin Marbles." He warmly endorsed the purchase, describing the frieze as a "procession for celebrating the Panathenaean festival." He praised its design, as well as the beauty, animation, and variety of its figures. On the east frieze, he saw "a Priestess...receiving from two kanephoroi [basket bearers]... articles for the rite of sacrifice, which they carry on their heads." To her right, "the reigning Archon... receiving, from the hands of a young man, a great piece of cloth, folded in a square form...the peplos."

This interpretation went unchallenged until 1871, when Adolf Michaelis published Der Parthenon, arguing that the two young women leading the procession were not carrying baskets on their heads, but rather four-legged stools (based on the formal similarity between the slim, vertical object in one girl's hand and the front legs of four stools nearby in the frieze). Classicists now had to choose between an established fact: religious processions in ancient Attica were typically led by girls carrying headbaskets; and this new opinion from a leading archaeologist. Other respected scholars kept the "stool carriers" idea alive throughout the 20th century, yet offered no convincing explanation for their presence here. Meanwhile, literary sources revealed that many figures seen in historical processions were absent from the frieze: Where are the foot-soldiers? the female water bearers? the Panathenaic ship? This encouraged various alternative understandings of the entire narrative: The frieze shows not one procession, but two. It represents an archetypal procession, set in mythical times. It commemorates the founding of Athens.

By century's end, numerous scholars had risen to defend the mainstream position. In The Parthenon Frieze, 1975, Martin Robertson dismissed all of the objections to the Panathenaic interpretation: "The frieze represents a procession, but it is not a documentary record; it is a highly sophisticated work of art." He identified multiple 5th-century officials and activities depicted in the marble. In 1977, Frank Brommer published Der Parthenonfries, cataloguing its marble blocks, and exploring its vast bibliography. In light of this evidence, he rejected all of the historicizing or mythological interpretations, as well as complaints about what was "missing." The procession that we see has not been observed, but invented.

In 1995, Burkhardt Wesenberg focused on the five figures at the center of the east frieze. He identified the two males on the right as the Archon Basileus and a boy, together holding up the sacred peplos. He argued that this peplos had been carried prominently in the procession, and would now, after this ceremonial folding, be presented to Athena. He also debunked the Michaelis stool theory: Why are these "stools" notably smaller than those actual stools nearby, while their oval "pillows" are so much larger? Why does one girl grasp a "leg," visibly well to her right, with her left hand? Wesenberg pointed to James Stuart's drawing of the scene (1751), in which that "leg" is not attached to the horizontal object above it.

As the 21st century began, The Parthenon Frieze by Jenifer Neils (2001) reestablished the mainstream narrative, with a comprehensive account of the frieze's design, the techniques employed by its sculptors, and the identities of the figures and groups portrayed. Neils explained the work's composite structure, evoking multiple aspects of a Panathenaic festival, yet presented as if it were a single event. She showed how the figures in the procession move simultaneously across space and through time.

Olga Palagia's "Women in the Cult of Athena" (2008), confirmed what is occurring on the left side of the peplos scene. Dismissing the "stools," she saw two head-baskets, carried by kanephoroi, and containing things required at the animal sacrifice. Palagia identified the "stool leg" as an incense burner, also necessary at the sacrifice. She suspected that the eroded object in one basket bearer's arm may be a libation cup, so that everything brought to the priestess is directly related to the coming sacrifice.

More recently, building on previous scholarship, T. L. Shear Jr. analyzed the innovative design of the sculpted procession. Burkhardt Wesenberg re-confirmed both the baskets and the portable incense burner in the final scene. Christianne Souvinou-Inwood suggested that the oval objects nesting in the girls' head-baskets are large loaves of leavened bread. And Robert Parker summed up the subject of the frieze: "The Greater Panathenaea is a superbly elaborated form of something quite simple: the presentation to a god of gifts, in this case a new robe and sacrificial animals."

== Influence ==
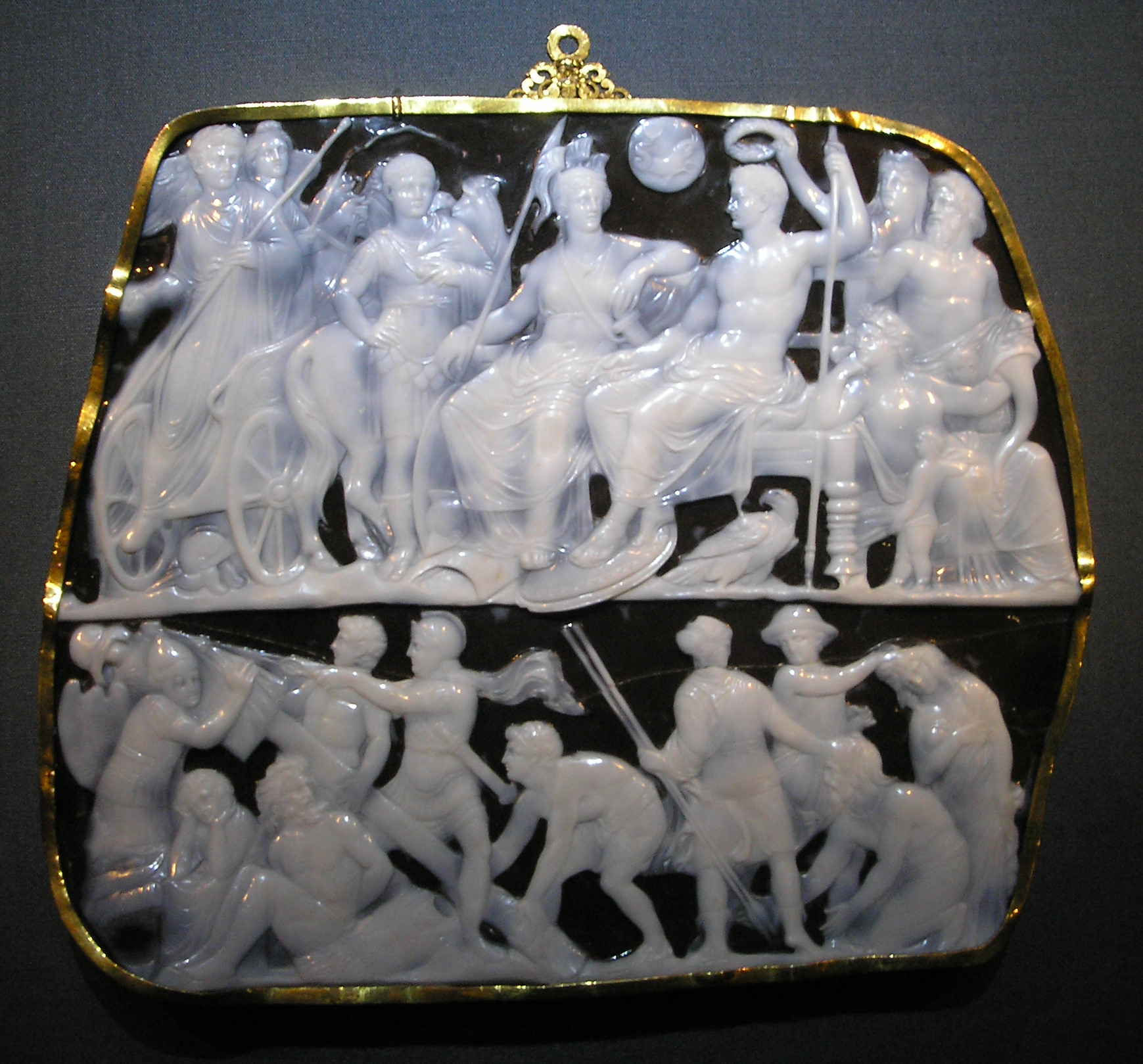
Gemma Augustea, Kunsthistorisches Museum Vienna

The earliest surviving works of art that exhibit traces of the influence of the Parthenon Frieze belong to the media of vase painting and grave stelae where we may find some echo not just of motifs, themes, poses, but tenor, as well. Direct imitation, and indeed quotation, of the frieze begins to be pronounced around 430 BC. One example, an explicit copy, is a pelike attributed to the Wedding Painter of a youth "parking up" a horse exactly in the manner of figure W25 on the frieze. While those vase paintings that resemble the frieze cluster around 430, the vases that quote the pediments are datable nearer to the end of the century, giving further evidence of the priority of the sculptural program. More accomplished painters also found inspiration in the sculpture, namely Polygnotos I and his group, especially the Peleus Painter, the Kleophon Painter and the late work of the Achilles Painter. Later painters of talent also managed to capture the mood of eusebeia, or thoughtful piety of the procession, as, for example, on the volute krater of the Kleophon Painter of a sacrifice to Apollo, which shares the quiet dignity of the best of High Classical sculpture.

The impact of the frieze may be sought in the Attic relief sculpture of the late fifth century; this resonance also may be discovered to some degree in the public works of the Hephaisteion frieze and the Nike Athena balustrade, where the imagery of the seated deities and the sandal-binder respectively, likely owes a debt to the Parthenon. There also are traces found on the private commissions of grave stelae from the period, for example, the "cat stele" from Aegina bears a distinct similarity to figures N135–6. As does the Hermes of the four-figure relief known from a Roman copy. Later classicizing art of the Hellenistic and Roman eras also looked to the frieze for inspiration as attested by the Lycian Sarcophagus of Sidon, Phoenicia, the Ara Pacis Augustae, the Gemma Augustea, and many pieces of the Hadrianic generation.
