= Hecatomb =

Sacrifice of 100 cattle

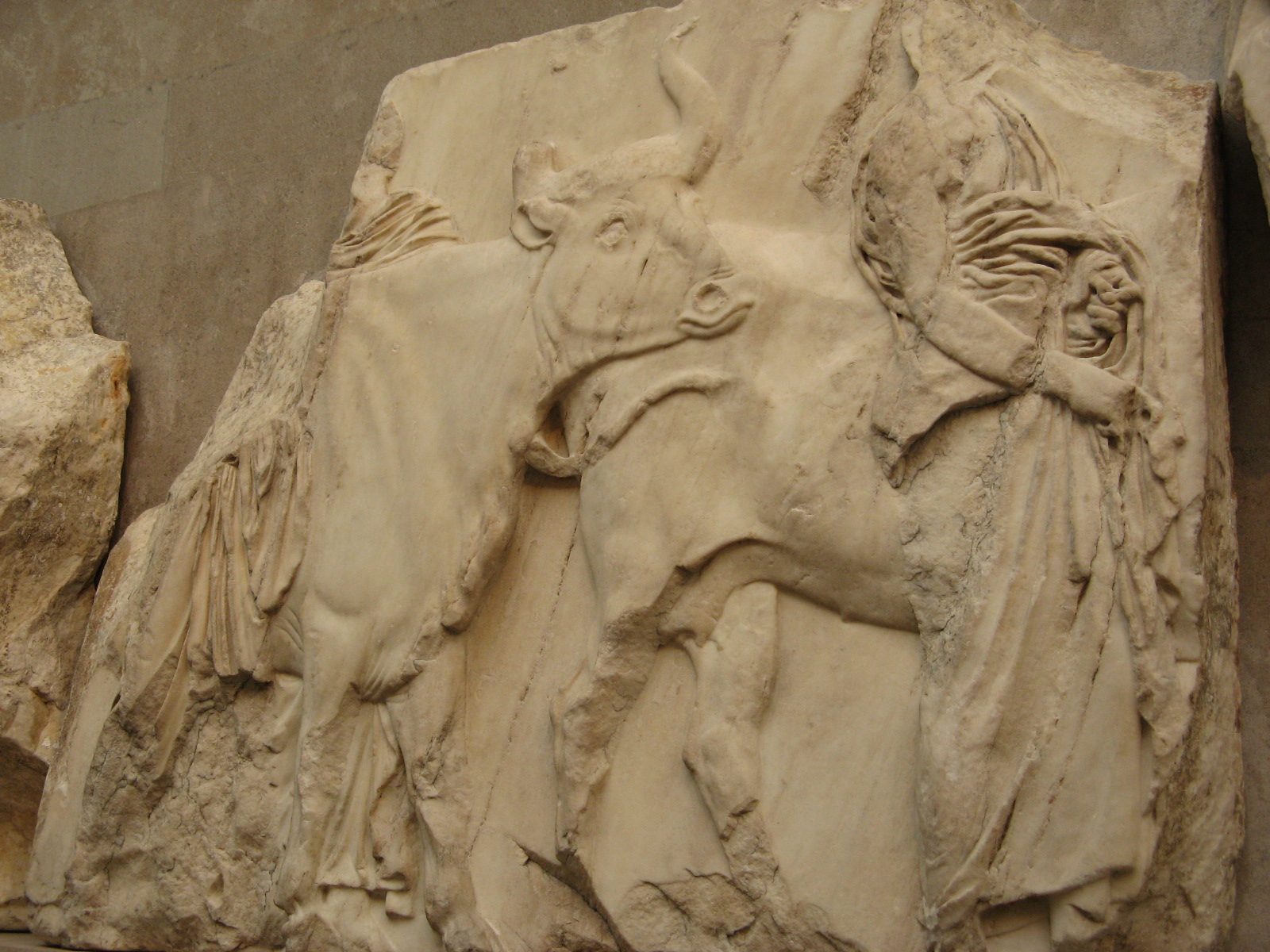
Sculpture of sacrificial bull from the Parthenon Frieze.

In ancient Greece, a hecatomb (UK: /ˈhɛkətuːm/; US: /ˈhɛkətoʊm/; Ancient Greek: ἑκατόμβη hekatómbē) was a sacrifice of one hundred cattle (hekaton "one hundred", bous "bull") to the Greek gods. In practice, as few as twelve could make up a hecatomb.

Although originally the sacrifice of a hundred oxen in the religious ceremonies of the Greeks and Romans, later "hecatomb" came to describe a large number of any kind of animals devoted to sacrifice. Figuratively, "hecatomb" is used to describe the mass death by violence, disease, manmade or natural disasters of any large number of persons or animals; and also of the wholesale destruction of inanimate objects, and even of mental and moral attributes.

== Ancient Greece ==
Hecatombs were offered to Greek gods Hera, Athena, and Apollo during special religious ceremonies. At the end of the Olympic Games, a hecatomb was also offered to Zeus at Olympia.

In the Iliad, hecatombs are described formulaically. The following is one instance, from Samuel Butler's translation:

[T]hey arranged the holy hecatomb all orderly round the altar of the god. They washed their hands and took up the barley-meal to sprinkle over the victims [cattle], while [the priest] lifted up his hands and prayed aloud on their behalf.

...

When they had done praying and sprinkling the barley-meal, they drew back the heads of the victims (Cattle) and killed and flayed them. They cut out the thigh-bones, wrapped them round in two layers of fat, set some pieces of raw meat on the top of them, and then [the priest] laid them on the wood fire and poured wine over them, while the young men stood near him with five-pronged spits in their hands. When the thigh-bones were burned and they had tasted the inward meats, they cut the rest up small, put the pieces upon the spits, roasted them till they were done, and drew them off: then, when they had finished their work and the feast was ready, they ate it, and every man had his full share, so that all were satisfied. As soon as they had had enough to eat and drink, pages filled the mixing-bowls with wine and water and handed it round, after giving every man his drink-offering.

Thus all day long the young men worshipped the god with song, hymning him and chaunting the joyous paean, and the god took pleasure in their voices[.]

== See also ==
- Fire worship
