= Arrephoros =

Female religious role in ancient Athens

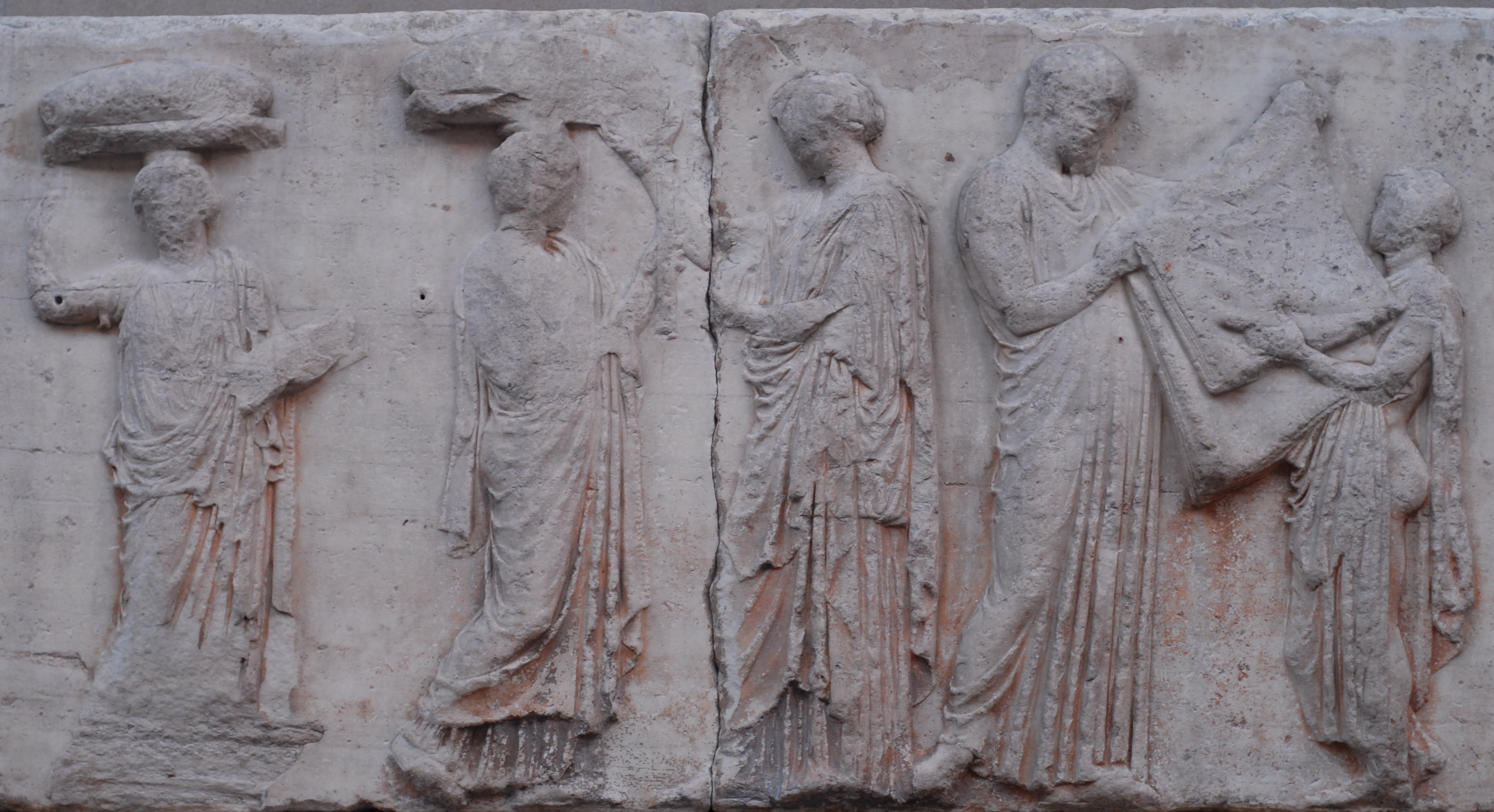
Peplos scene on the east side of the Parthenon frieze. The second figure from the right is folding the peplos; a boy is assisting.

An Arrephoros (Ancient Greek: Ἀρρήφορος) was a girl acolyte in the cult of Athena Polias on the Athenian Acropolis. They were seven to eleven years old. According to Pausanias, two Arrephoroi lived for a year on the Acropolis and concluded their term with a mystery rite called the Arrhephoria: they carried unknown objects into a cavern, and there exchanged them for other unknown objects.

The lexicon of Harpocration states (s.v. Arrêphorein) that there were four Arrephoroi and that two supervised the weaving of the Panathenaic peplos.

== Sources ==
- Joan Breton Connelly, Portrait of a priestess: Women and Ritual in Ancient Greece, p. 27 ISBN 0-691-12746-8
