= Skira =

Religious festival in ancient Athens

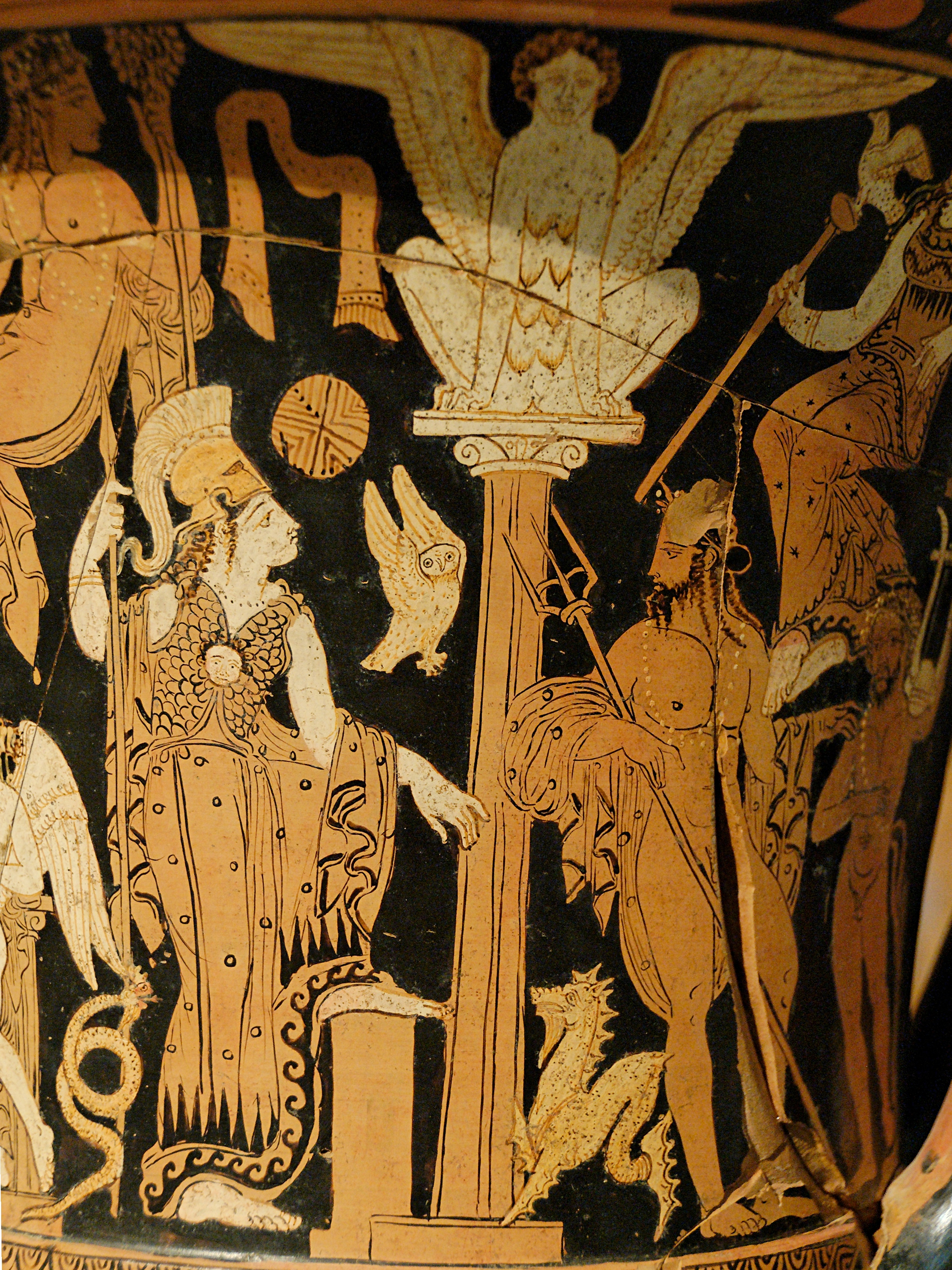
Athena and Poseidon, Faliscan red-figure volute-krater ca. 360 B.C.

The festival of the Skira (Ancient Greek: Σκίρα) or Skirophoria (Ancient Greek: Σκιροφόρια) in the calendar of ancient Athens, closely associated with the Thesmophoria, marked the dissolution of the old year in May/June.

== Description ==
At Athens, the last month of the year was Skirophorion, after the festival. Its most prominent feature was the procession that led out of Athens to a place called Skiron near Eleusis, in which the priestess of Athena, the priest of Poseidon, and in later times, the priest of Helios, took part, under a ceremonial canopy called the skiron, which was held up by a member of the family of the Eteoboutadai or by the priest of Erechtheus. Their joint temple on the Acropolis was the Erechtheum, where Poseidon embodied as Erechtheus remained a numinous presence. The canopy symbolized the protection of the Attic soil from the blazing heat of the sun.

At Skiron there was a sanctuary dedicated to Demeter/Kore and one to Athena.

As a festival of dissolution, the Skira was a festival proverbial for license, in which men played dice games, but a time also of daytime fasting, and of the inversion of the social order, for the bonds of marriage were suspended, as women banded together and left the quarters where they were ordinarily confined, to eat garlic together "according to ancestral custom", and to sacrifice and feast together, at the expense of the men. The Skira is the setting for Aristophanes' comedy Ecclesiazusae (393 BCE), in which the women seize the opportunity afforded by the festival, to hatch their plot to overthrow male domination.

== See also ==
- Athenian festivals
