= Gamelia =

Ancient Greek custom of introducing a wife to a phratry

The term gamelia (Γαμηλία) can refer to several ancient Athenian customs revolving around the act of marriage. Most often it relates to the practice in which a new husband would perform an offering in honor of his recent marriage for his phratry during the Apaturia.

== Citizenship and the Apaturia ==
Taking place during the three-day festival in the month of Pyanepsion, the gamelia was a part of a series of initiatory rituals revolving around the phratries. It was a way to secure public recognition of a marriage, as it introduced the new union to the phratry while also signaling a change in status and lifestyle for the groom to the group.

The ritual likely became very significant after 451/450 when Pericles' new citizenship laws were enacted: these asserted that both parents had to be of Athenian origin in order for a child to be deemed "legitimate", thus getting full political rights of citizenship through admittance to a phratry and deme. Prior to Pericles' law, only the father or adoptive father of the inductee had to be Athenian. Phratry membership revolved around the idea of kinship linked through a common male ancestral line: the fathers had to be free Athenian citizens with membership in order for the sons to be inducted. Following 451, citizenship was more restrictive: Without Athenian origin on both sides, young men would not be considered astoi and eligible for participation in Athenian political life. Rather, any children born of a union not between two Athenians could be considered nothoi, meaning bastards, or metics, and excluded from the full rights of citizenship. Pericles' law raised the stakes, elevating engyetic marriage in pursuit of "legitimate" Athenian heirs.

The gamelia was a way to prove the status of the mother, as this ritual was essentially an act of introduction to the phratry. If the legitimacy of a son was ever contested on the grounds of parentage, the young man could point to the celebration of his parents' gamelia in the memory of the phratores, signifying they were both true Athenian. It was probably practiced prior to 451/450, but it took on new importance with increasingly restrictive Athenian citizenship laws.

This is seen in the literature of the period, such as in Demosthenes 57, where Euxitheos calls upon phratry members who witnessed his father's gamelia, celebrated on his mother's behalf, to prove his legitimacy. A level of scrutiny was common to the admittance practices of the Koureotis, the final day of the Apaturia in which young men are formally inducted. In the phratry of Apollodoros of Leukonion, for example, the sponsor would have to swear on the sacrificial victim that the candidate was the son of true Athenian citizens. Oaths and the presentation of members such as this were commonplace, functioning to ensure that only "true" Athenians could be endowed with full citizenship rights.

== In practice ==
In regard to the specific practice of gamelia, it appears to have been both an offering of wine and food as a feast for fellow members as well as an accompanying sacrifice. An account is portrayed in Aristophanes' Peace, where Trygaios brings a ram to be sacrificed in celebration of his new bride. Trygaios also adds includes certain food in the banquet, such as bread and some game, which are assumed to be typical gamelia offerings (cf. the darata of the Labyadai, CID I).

It is unclear whether all phratries required gamelia following marriage, as nomoi differed depending on the phratry. For the phratry of Pyrrhos, for example, gamelia was expressly required, written down in a nomos. This suggests that perhaps not all phratries demanded gamelia to follow the marriages of their members, but the benefits made it a popular custom: like the registration of the infant's name, it would be future insurance of the child's political and inheritance rights. Given the death of the parents, or rumors of a future affair, the recognition of the marriage by the phratry would prove instrumental. Another unclear aspect of the ritual is whether or not the brides themselves were actually present: given the nature of the male-oriented phratry, they probably would have remained on the margins of the group, rather than playing a central role. Although there is no consensus, some scholars point to another feast, the gamoi, as one which included women; the contrasting depiction of the two in literature points to the conclusion that the gamelia was an all-male celebration for just the phratry.

It also appears that for Athenians of lower socio-economic classes, weddings and gamelia could be celebrated together. This is possible if the families involved lived close by where the phratry traditionally met, cutting down on travel and festival costs for both parties by hosting it alongside the Apaturia. This would still allow for the procession, an important and symbolic crux of the gamos where the bride is taken to the home of her new husband, to take place. Middle and upper-class families, however, most likely held the ceremonies separately. The temporal distance allowed for more of a focus on the gamos itself, rather than the activities of the phratry. It also meant a separate occasion for celebration in their own homes, where they could exhibit status and hospitality more openly.

In fact, most weddings were held during the month of Gamelion, our months of January and February. Fittingly, the Apaturia occurred nine months after: This was based on the notion that a child would be conceived soon following marriage, and at the Apaturia he would then be registered in his father's phratry as a newborn. Evidently the timing of childbirth did not always work out this way, and infants would just be registered at the Apaturia the following year.

== Wedding day uses ==
The term gamelia took on other meanings outside of the Apaturia festival, also relating to a ritual on the eve of the gamos or wedding day. The bride-to-be was led to the Acropolis of Athens to the temple of Athena by her parents; there, under the watch of the priestess of Athena Polias, a series of proteleia or preliminary sacrifices took place. These would be animal sacrifices as well as fruit offerings, and several other deities would be honored in the following proteleia. Zeus, Hera, Aphrodite, Peitho, and Artemis were all sacrificed to as well in the hope that they would protect and preside over the marriage. Chief among these was Hera Gamelia, the cult epithet meaning Hera of the Wedding, and as a group they were referred to as the Gamellii gods.
