= Chalceia =

Ancient Greek religious festival

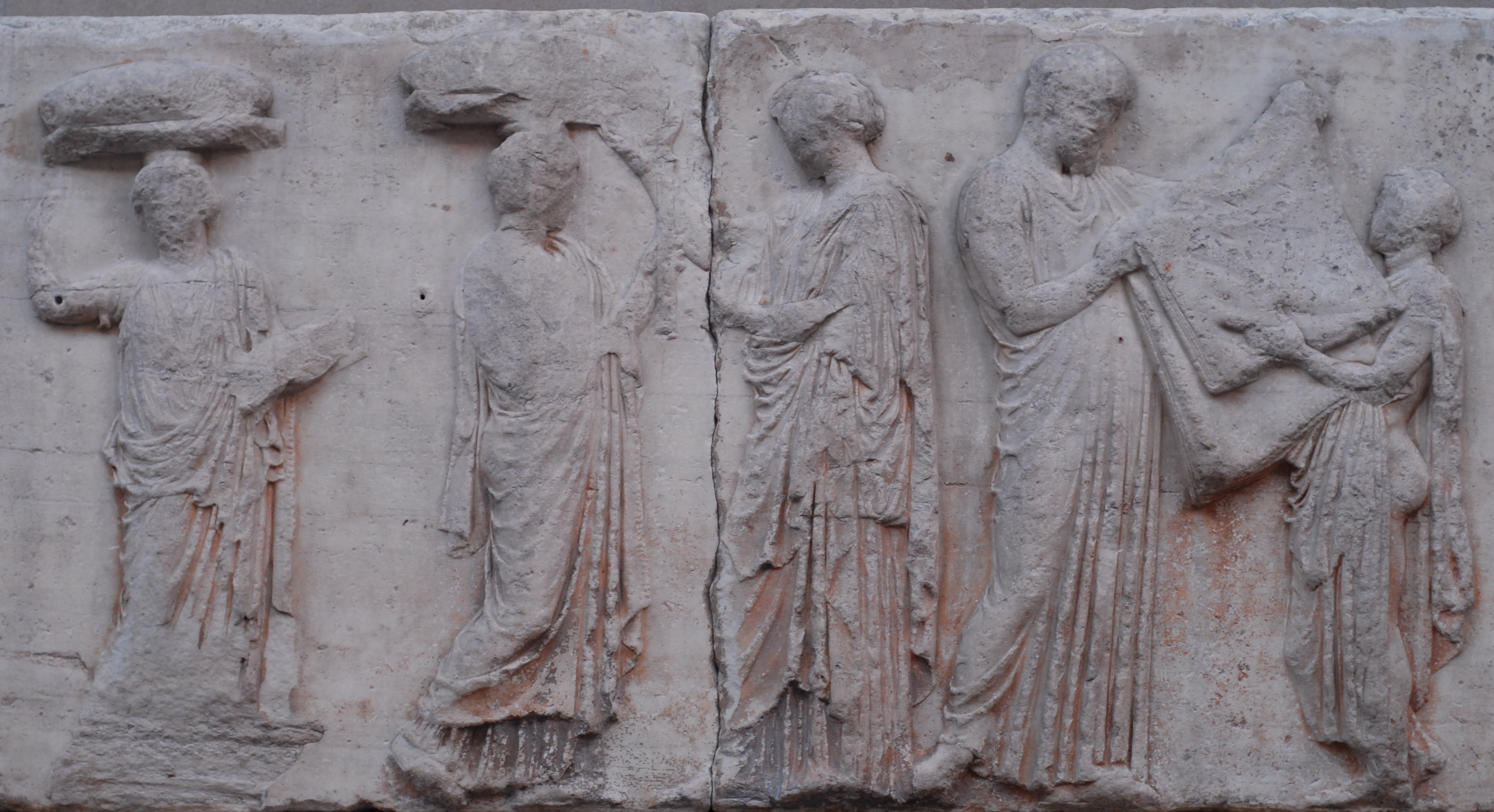

The Chalkeia festival (also spelled Chalceia), the festival of Bronze-workers, was a religious festival devoted to the goddess Athena and the god Hephaestus. It was celebrated on the last day of Pyanepsion (October or November in the Attic calendar). The festival celebrated Athena and Hephaestus, in honor of both gods as patron deities of Athens, and as deities of handicrafts.

Each year, preparations were begun for a specialized peplos (a robed garment worn by Greek women), which was made to be offered to the goddess at another festival, the Panathenaea.

== Traditions ==
Though Hephaestus was involved, the festival's main focus was Athena, specifically under the epithet Athena Hephaistia and Athena Ergane. The offerings recorded for each day were always for Athena, not her male counterpart. Also, the main focus of the festival (the sacred peplos) was for Athena, while Hephaestus wasn't given any gifts.

'Athena Hephaista' was the epithet given to Athena in this context as a special association with Hephaestus, the god of the smiths. A statue of this aspect of Athena was constructed in the Hephaisteion next to the cult statue of Hephaestus in 343 B.C.

‘Athena Ergane’ was a specific title given to Athena as the patron of crafts, particularly weaving. Under this moniker, she was the goddess of all handicrafts, or functional artwork. To honor this, on the day of the festival, a loom is set up by the priestesses of Athena and the Arrephoroi. From the loom, a great peplos is warped and woven. The Arrephoroi were young girls, not much more than seven years old, and had been chosen by the archon basileus from four aristocratic girls nominated by the Athenian people. Because of their youth they were not really directly involved with the weaving, but it was believed that the beginning of the work was blessed by their presence. It was considered a great honor to be chosen to be an Arrephoros; there are honorific portrait statues and inscribed statues that have been found that commemorate various daughters’ involvement as child servants of Athena.

== The Sacred Peplos ==
Athena Ergane was the goddess of spinning and weaving, and so every year at the Chalkeia, on the day of the festival, the priestesses of Athena Polias and the young Arrephoroi would ritualistically set up a loom to make a sacred peplos to be offered to the goddess. It is very likely that the Graces, were somehow involved in the ritual of setting up the loom, and contributed to weaving the peplos.

On this loom, the enormous peplos was woven by women volunteers, the ergastinai (meaning “female weavers”), who were either virgin girls of marriageable age or older matrons. Every year the peplos was woven by the Ergastinai under the supervision of a priestess of the Athena's cult. When the work at the loom began, the Arrephoroi wore white robes, and were present to offer their perceived sacredness.

There were two ways the peplos was made: it was either a smaller peplos made by women, or a larger one made by men. The smaller peplos was woven annually by the ergastinai, and offered as a robe for the statue of Athena Polias during the Lesser Panathenaea. The larger peplos was woven every four years by male professional weavers, and was presented to Athena at the Greater Panathenaea.

Regardless of size, the weavers had to create a particular scene on the peplos: Athena's defeat of Enceladus and the Olympian's defeat of the Giants, the Gigantomachy. During the battle between the Gigantes and the Olympian gods, Enceladus was disabled by a spear thrown by the goddess Athena.

== See also ==
- Athenian festivals
