= Wreath =

Ring-shaped ornament

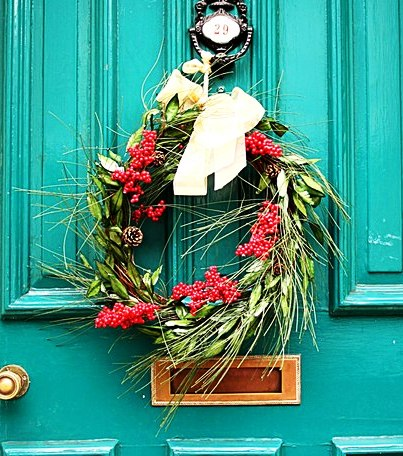
A Christmas wreath on a house door in England.

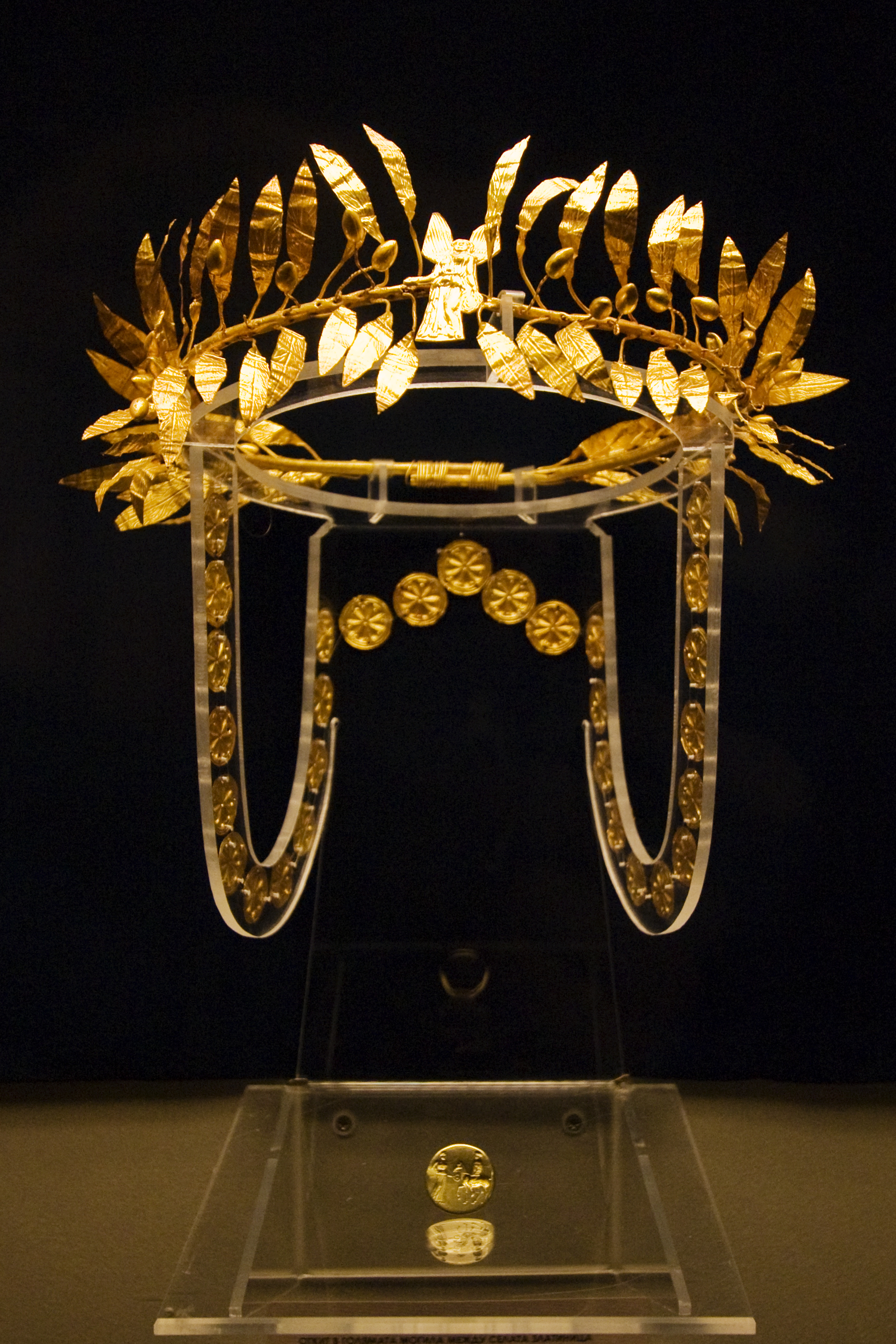
A golden wreath and ring from the burial of an Odrysian Aristocrat at the Golyamata Mogila in the Yambol region of Bulgaria. Mid 4th century BC.

A wreath (/riːθ/) is an assortment of flowers, leaves, fruits, twigs, or various materials that is constructed to form a ring shape.

In western countries, wreaths are used typically as household ornaments, most commonly as an Advent and Christmas decoration. They are also used in ceremonial events in many cultures around the globe. They can be worn as a chaplet around the head, or as a garland around the neck.

== Etymology ==
The word wreath comes from Middle English wrethe and from Old English writha 'band'.

== History ==
=== Ancient Etruscan wreaths ===
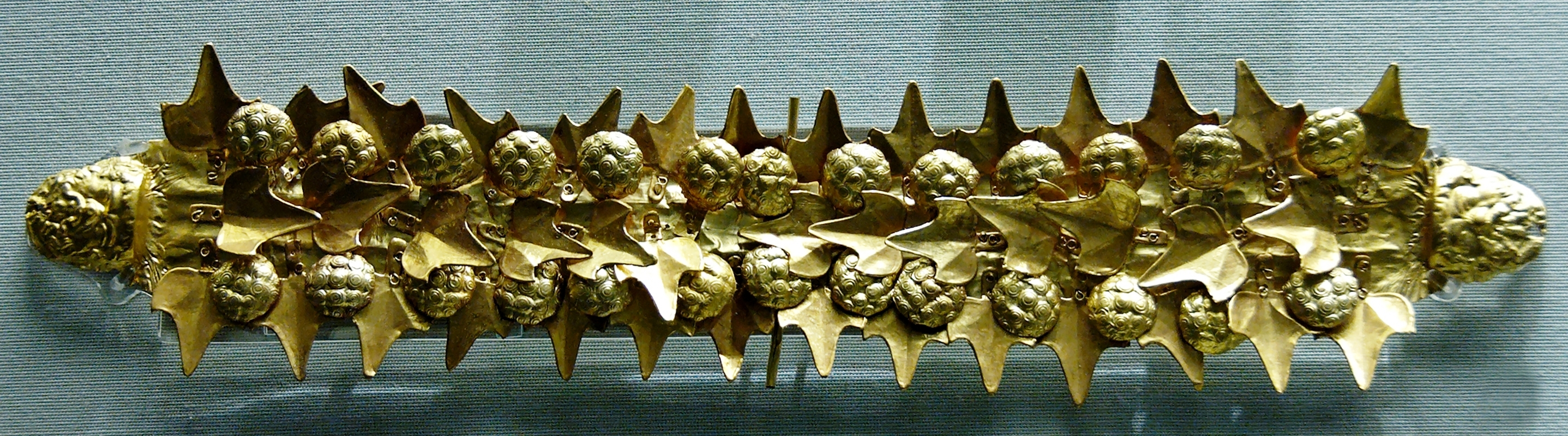
Wreath with ivy leaves and berries, a satyr's head at either end. Gold sheet, Etruscan artwork, 400–350 BC. From a tomb near Tarquinia.

Wreaths were a design used in ancient times in southern Europe. The most well-known are pieces of Etruscan civilization jewelry, made of gold or other precious metals. Symbols from Greek myths often appear in the designs, embossed in precious metal at the ends of the wreath. Ancient Roman writers referred to Etruscan corona sutilis, which were wreaths with their leaves sewn onto a background. These wreaths resemble a diadem, with thin metal leaves being attached to an ornamental band. Wreaths also appear stamped into Etruscan medallions. The plants shown making the wreaths in Etruscan jewelry include ivy, oak, olive leaves, myrtle, laurel, wheat and vines.

Wreaths were worn as crowns by Etruscan rulers. The Etruscan symbolism continued to be used in Ancient Greece and Rome. Roman magistrates also wore golden wreaths as crowns, as a symbolic testament to their lineage back to Rome's early Etruscan rulers. Roman magistrates also used several other prominent Etruscan symbols in addition to a golden wreath crown: fasces, a curule chair, a purple toga, and an ivory rod.

=== Ancient Greece and Rome ===
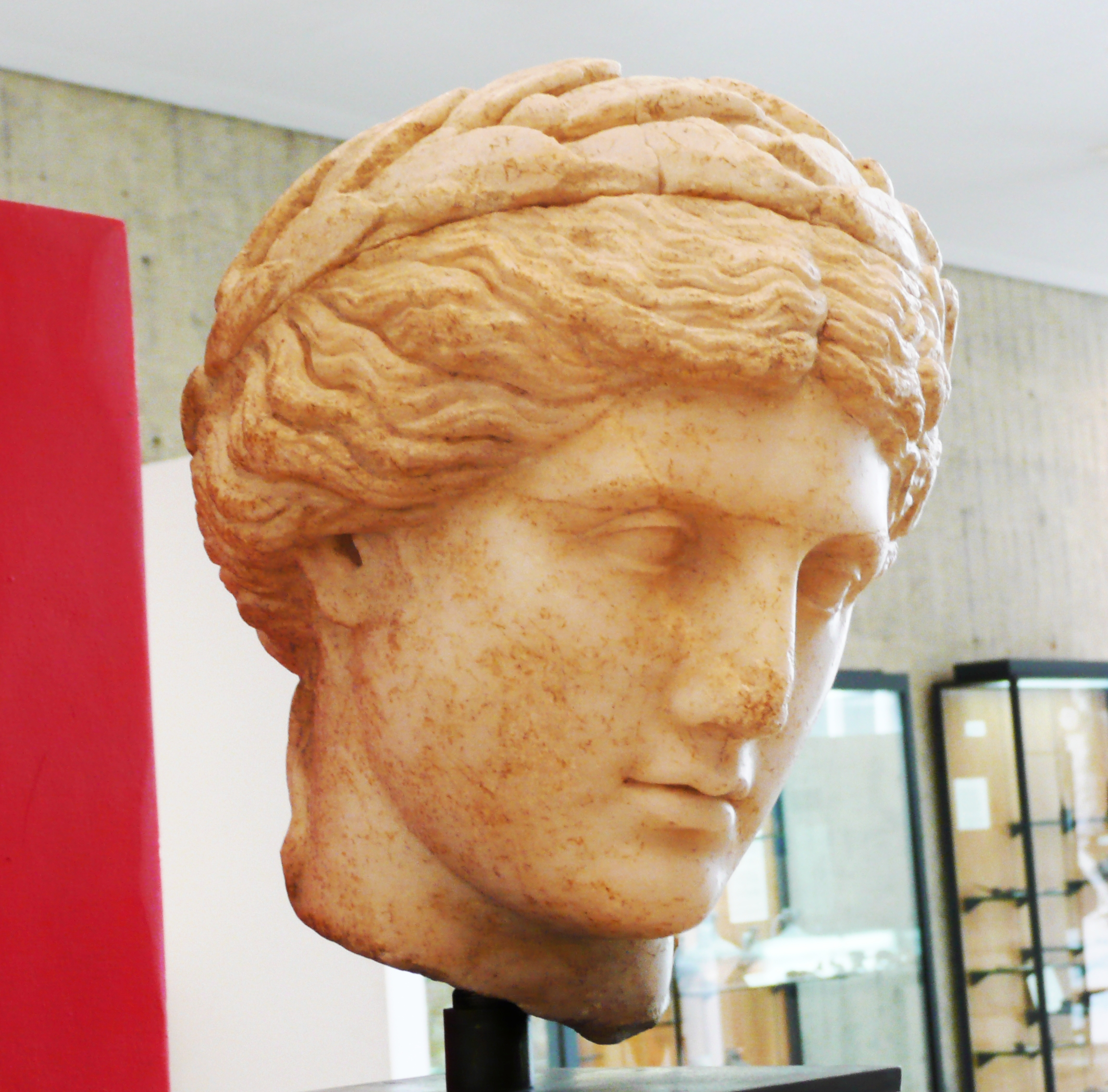
A replica bust of Apollo wearing a laurel wreath.

In the Greco-Roman world, wreaths were used as an adornment that could represent a person's occupation, rank, their achievements and status. The wreath that was commonly used was the laurel wreath. The use of this wreath comes from the Greek myth involving Apollo, Zeus' son and the god of life and light, who fell in love with the nymph Daphne. When he pursued her she fled and asked the river god Peneus to help her. Peneus turned her into a laurel tree. From that day, Apollo wore a wreath of laurel on his head. Laurel wreaths became associated with what Apollo embodied; victory, achievement and status and would later become one of the most commonly used symbols to address achievement throughout Greece and Rome. Laurel wreaths were used to crown victorious athletes at the original Olympic Games and are still worn in Italy by university students who just graduated.

Other types of plants used to make wreath crowns also had symbolic meaning. For example, oak leaves symbolized wisdom, and were associated with Zeus, who according to Greek mythology made his decisions while resting in an oak grove. The Twelve Tables, dating to 450 BC, refer to funeral wreaths as a long-standing tradition. Olive wreath was the prize for the winner at the ancient Olympic Games.

== Modern wreaths ==
=== Advent and Christmas wreaths ===
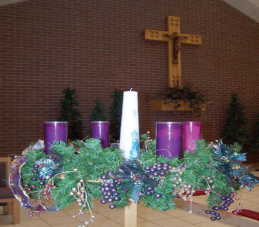
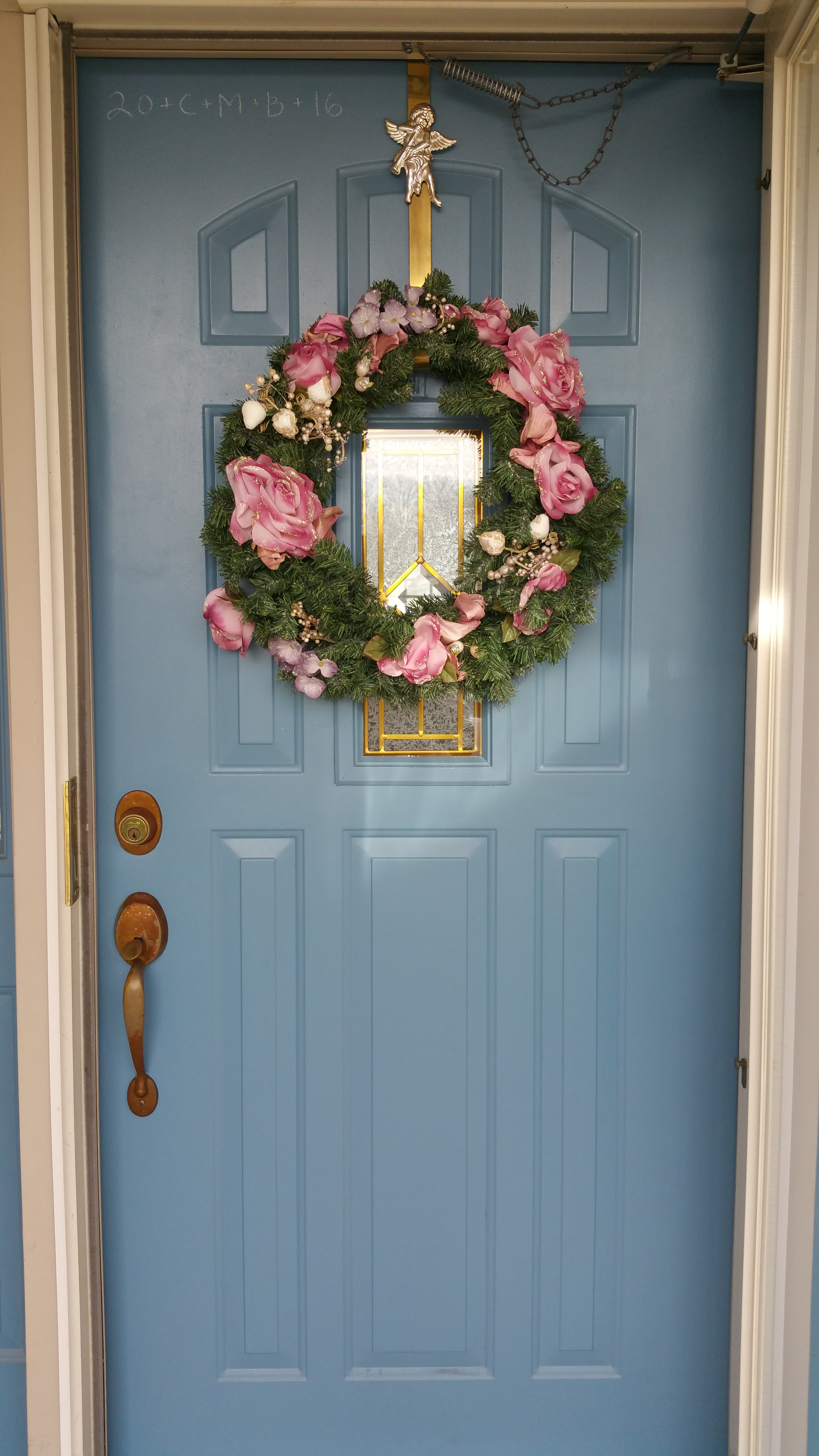
A five-candle Advent wreath in the chancel of a Christian church (top) and a Christmas wreath adorning an American home, with the door chalked for Epiphanytide and the wreath hanger bearing a placard of the Angel Gabriel (bottom)

In Christianity, wreaths are used to observe the Advent season, in preparation for Christmastide and Epiphanytide, as well as to celebrate the latter two liturgical seasons. These wreaths, as with other Advent and Christmas decorations, are often set up on the first Sunday of Advent, a custom that is sometimes done liturgically, through a hanging of the greens ceremony. The Advent wreath was first used by Lutherans in Germany in the 16th century, and in 1839, Lutheran priest Johann Hinrich Wichern used a wreath made from a cart wheel to educate children about the meaning and purpose of Christmas, as well as to help them count its approach, thus giving rise to the modern version of the Advent wreath. For every Sunday of Advent, starting with the fourth Sunday before Christmas, he would put a white candle in the wreath and for every day in between he would use a red candle. The use of the Advent wreath has since spread from the Lutheran Church to many Christian denominations, and some of these traditions, such as the Catholic Church and Moravian Church, have introduced unique variations to it. All of the Advent wreaths, however, have four candles, and many of them have a white candle in the centre, the Christ candle, which is lit on Christmas Day. Advent and Christmas wreaths are constructed of evergreens to represent everlasting life brought through Jesus and the circular shape of the wreath represents God, with no beginning and no end. Advent and Christmas wreaths are now a popular symbol in preparation for and to celebrate the coming of Christ, with the former being used to mark the beginning of the Christian Church's liturgical year and both serving as décor during Advent and Christmas festivities. While Advent wreaths are erected on stands or placed on tables, Christmas wreaths are often hung on doors or walls. Within Advent, the Church observes Saint Lucy's Day, the memorial of Saint Lucy, who is said to have brought "food and aid to Christians hiding in the catacombs" using a candle-lit wreath to "light her way and leave her hands free to carry as much food as possible"; as such, on this day, many young Christian girls dress as Saint Lucy, wearing a wreath on their head.

=== Decorative wreaths ===
Decorative wreaths originated in Ancient Greece, they were used to promote healthy crop harvests, it would be made from the previous years harvest (such as wheat) and would be hung on people's doors in hope for a fruitful harvest in the coming year.

In recent years, wreaths have experienced a significant surge in popularity as versatile home decor items.

=== Corpus Christi wreaths ===
On the eve of the Feast of Corpus Christi, Christian clergy (chiefly those from the Roman Catholic, Lutheran, and Anglican traditions) bless Corpus Christi wreaths that are made of flowers. Wreaths and bouquets are often "attached to flags and banners, to houses, and to the arches of green boughs that span the streets." In Christian homes, these wreaths are suspended on walls or displayed on doors and in windows. Corpus Christi wreaths are also "put up in gardens, fields, and pastures, with a prayer for protection and blessing upon the growing harvest."

=== Funeral and memorial wreaths ===
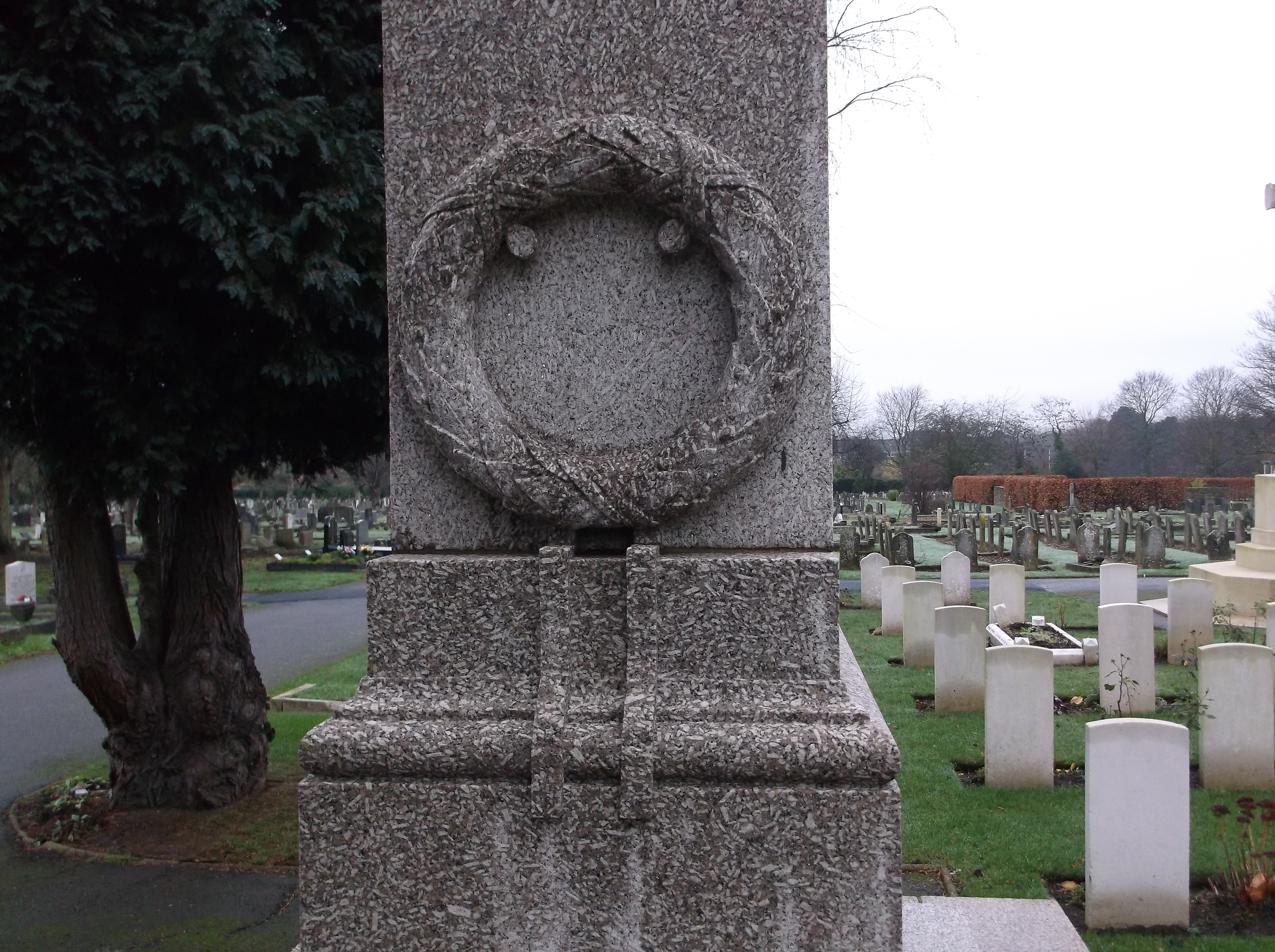
A sculpted wreath on the South African War Memorial, Richmond Cemetery

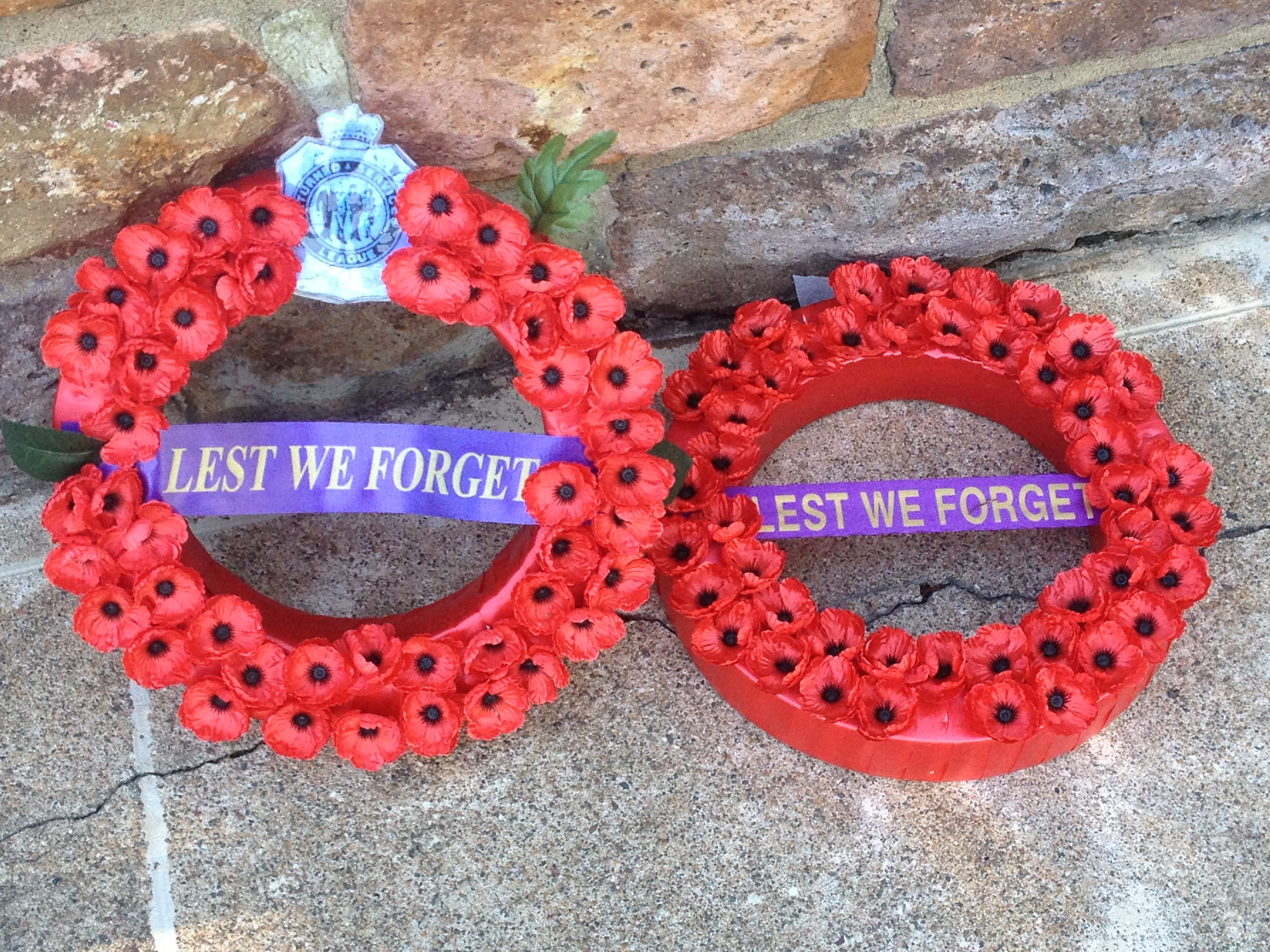
Wreaths laid at war memorials in Australia

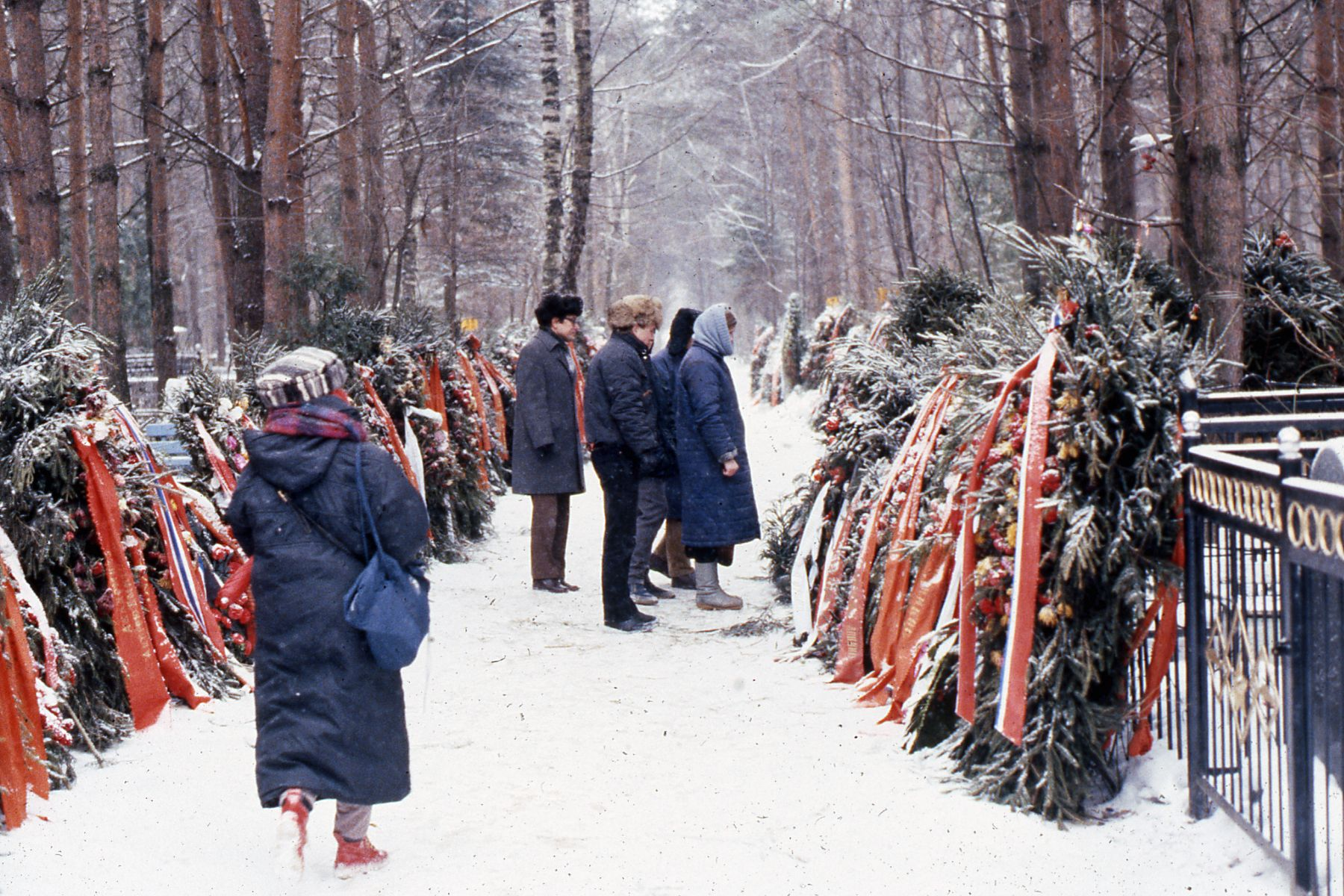
Wreaths are mounted on frames near the Moscow grave of Russian intellectual Andrei Sakharov, 1990

The symbolism of wreaths has been used at funerals since at least the time of Ancient Greece, to represent a circle of eternal life. Evergreen wreaths were laid at the burial place of early Christian virgin martyrs in Europe, the evergreen representing the victory of the eternal spirit over death.

In early modern England, a wreath custom existed for the funerals of "young maidens". A young woman of the same age as the one being mourned would lead the funeral procession, carrying a wreath of white flowers to represent the purity of the deceased, and "that eternal crown of glory reserved for her in heaven".

By the Victorian era, the symbolism of flowers had grown to become an elaborate language, and the symbolism of funeral wreaths was no exception. Flowers represented life and resurrection. Specific flowers were used in funeral wreaths to represent particular sentiments. Cypress and willow were used for crafting wreath frames, and were associated with mourning by the Victorians.

Wreaths are commonly laid at the tombs of soldiers and at memorial cenotaphs during Memorial Day and Remembrance Day ceremonies. Wreaths may also be laid in memory of persons lost at sea, either from an accident or due to navy action. In a memorial service at sea, the wreath is lowered to the water and set adrift. Funeral wreaths were also commonly adorned with a "wreath sash", a term coined in the World War II era, which was decorated with fringe and embroidered to commemorate life and sacrifice. This practice is still in place today, and wreath sashes now commonly adorn doors of homes to celebrate numerous holidays.

=== Harvest wreath ===
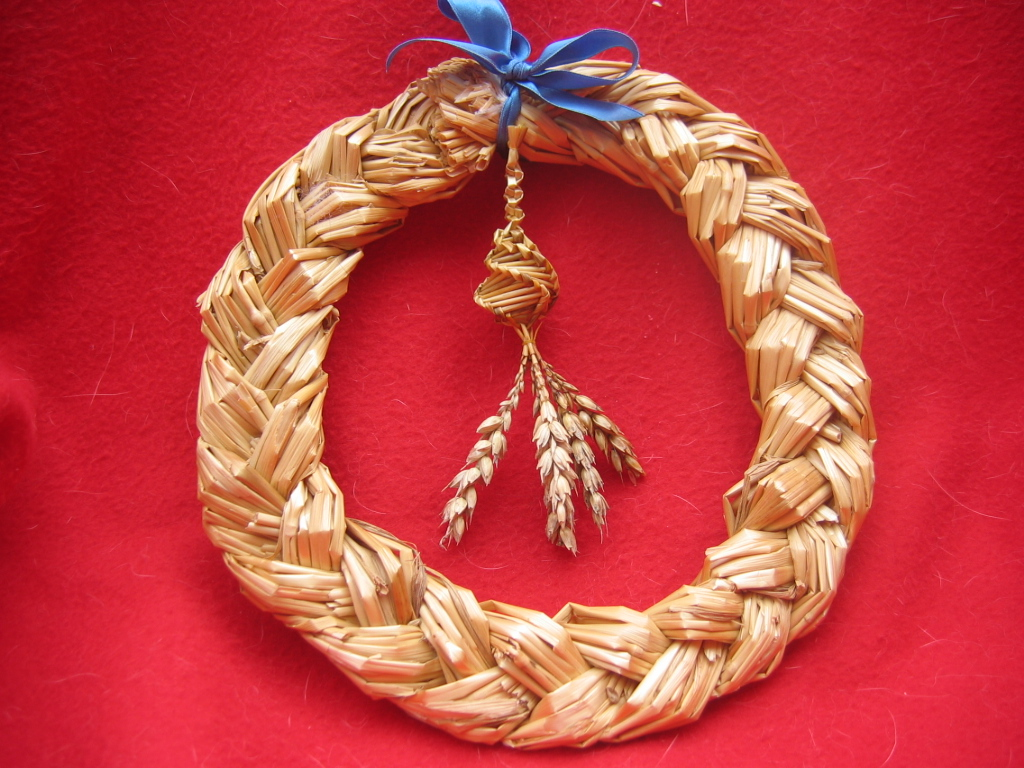
A Scandinavian-style harvest wreath made of woven straw.

Harvest wreaths, a common household decoration today, are a custom with ancient roots in Europe. The creation of harvest wreaths in Europe can be traced back to ancient times, and is associated with animistic spiritual beliefs. In Ancient Greece, the harvest wreath was a sacred amulet, using wheat or other harvested plants, woven together with red and white wool thread. The harvest wreath would be hung by the door year-round.

Harvest wreaths were an important symbol to the community in Ancient Greece, not merely to the farmer and his family. The festivals devoted to Dionysus, the Oschophoria and Anthesteria, included a ritual procession called the eiresîonê. A harvest wreath was carried to Pyanopsia and Thargelia by young boys, who would sing during the journey. The laurel or olive wreath would be hung at the door, and then offerings were made to Helios and the Hours. It was hoped that this ritual would bring protection against crop failure and plagues.

In Poland, the harvest wreath (wieniec) is a central symbol of the Harvest Festival, Dozynki. Wreaths are made of different shapes and sizes, using harvested grain plants, fruit and nuts. The wreath is then brought to a church for a blessing by a priest. The tradition includes a procession to the family home from the church, with a girl or young woman leading the procession and carrying the wreath. The procession is followed with a celebration and feast.

== Wreaths worn as crowns ==
A wreath may be used as a headdress made from leaves, flowers and branches. It is typically worn in festive occasions and on holy days. Wreaths originally were made for use with pagan rituals in Europe, and were associated with the changing seasons and fertility. Christianity appropriated the symbolism of the wreath based upon its Roman association with honour and moral virtue. During the Middle Ages, Christian art featured depictions of the Virgin Mary and various saints crowned with wreaths, much as figures from Roman and Greek mythology were depicted wearing wreaths, as well as Roman and Greek rulers and heroes.

=== Maypole wreath ===
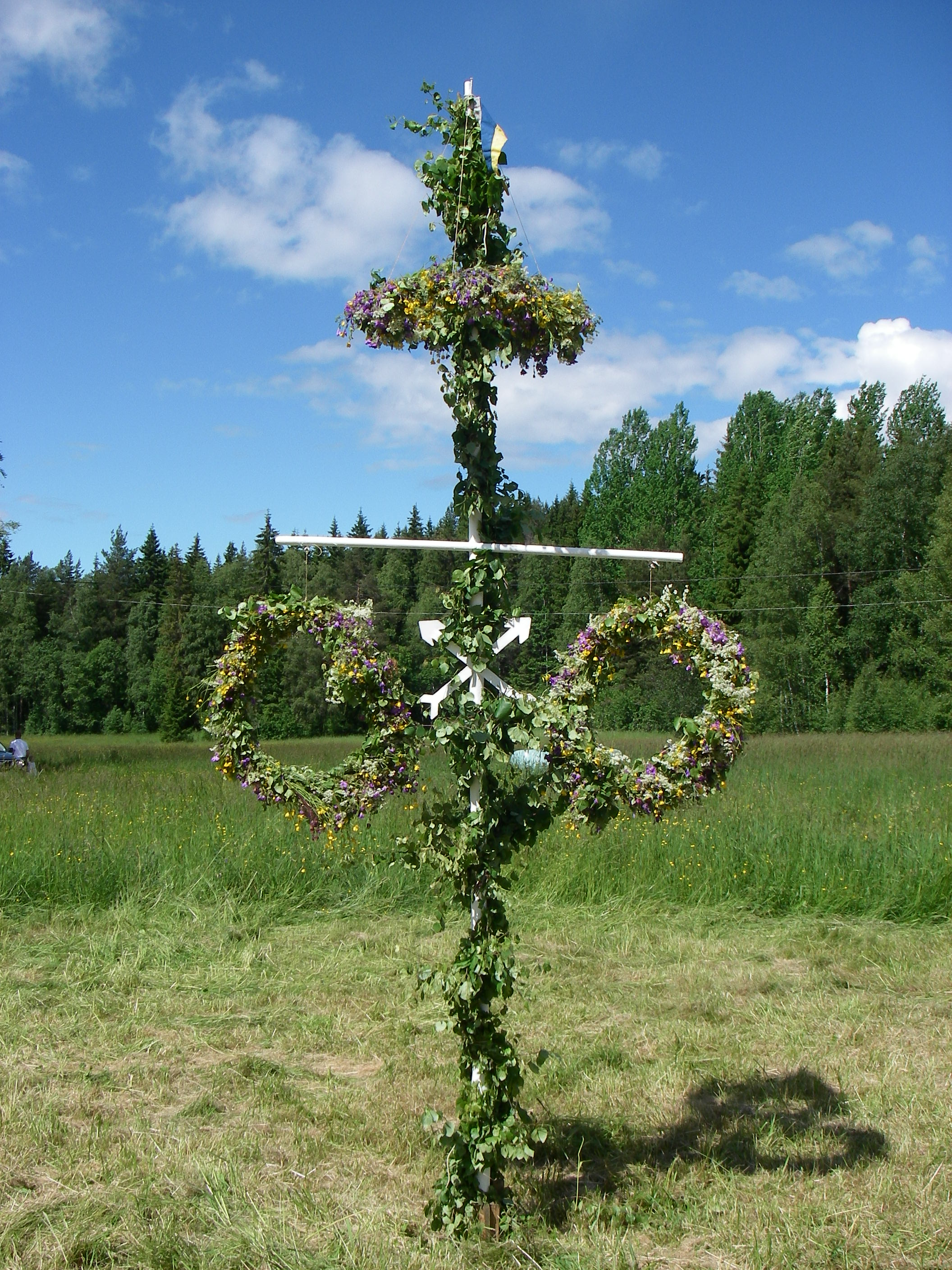
A Maypole with wreaths, raised for Midsummer celebrations in Östra Insjö, Dalarna, Sweden

Wreath customs in Europe have survived over many centuries. The observance of May Day in England includes Maypole festivities, culminating in a race by young unmarried men to climb to the top of the Maypole to capture the May Day wreath perched at the top of the pole. The winner of this contest would wear the wreath as his crown, and would be recognized as the May Day King for the rest of the holiday. Plants traditionally used to make Midsummer wreaths and garlands include white lilies, green birch, fennel, St. John's Wort, wormwood, vervain and flax. The flowers used in making the Midsummer wreath had to be picked early in the morning before the dew had dried; the belief was that once the dew dried, the magical properties of the plants evaporated with the dew.

Midsummer celebrations are still observed in Germany and Scandinavia as well, with Maypoles and wreaths playing a prominent role, similar to England.

=== Wreath symbolism in England ===
By the Renaissance period, wreaths became symbols of political and religious alliances in England. Protestant reformers such as the Puritans saw wreaths and the holidays they were associated with, such as May Day, as being pagan corrupting influences that destroyed healthy Christian morality. Soldiers confiscated wreaths in Oxford on May Day of 1648. During the Interregnum following the overthrow of Charles I of England, wreaths symbolized Royalist sympathies. In Bath, Somerset, the coronation of Charles II of England was marked with a procession of 400 maidens in white and green, carrying "gilded crowns, crowns made of flowers, and wreaths made of laurel mixed with tulips", and led by the mayor's wife.

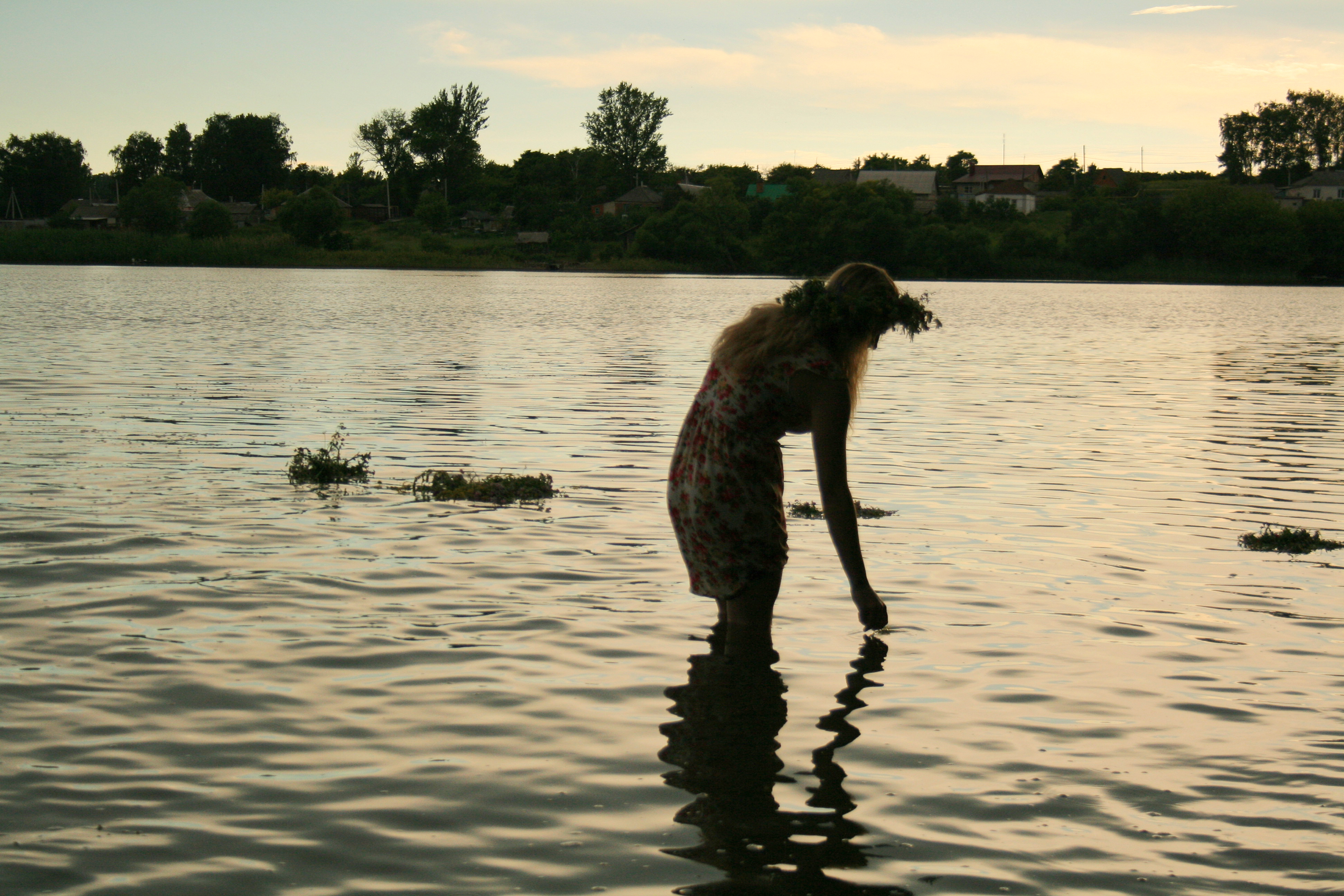
Wreath thrown in water on Ivan Kupala Day Feast of St. John the Baptist, in Russia

=== Saint Lucy's Day crown ===
Saint Lucy is traditionally depicted in Christian artwork wearing a wreath as a crown, and on the wreath stand lit candles symbolizing the light of the world represented by Christ. Sweden in particular has a long history of observing Saint Lucy's Day (St. Lucia's Day). "St. Lucia's crowns", made of a brass wreath holding candles, are part of the customs associated with this holiday.

== Wreath laying ceremonies ==
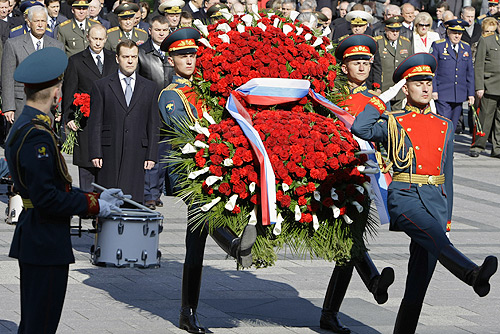
A laying of a wreath at the Tomb of the Unknown Soldier in Moscow, May 2008

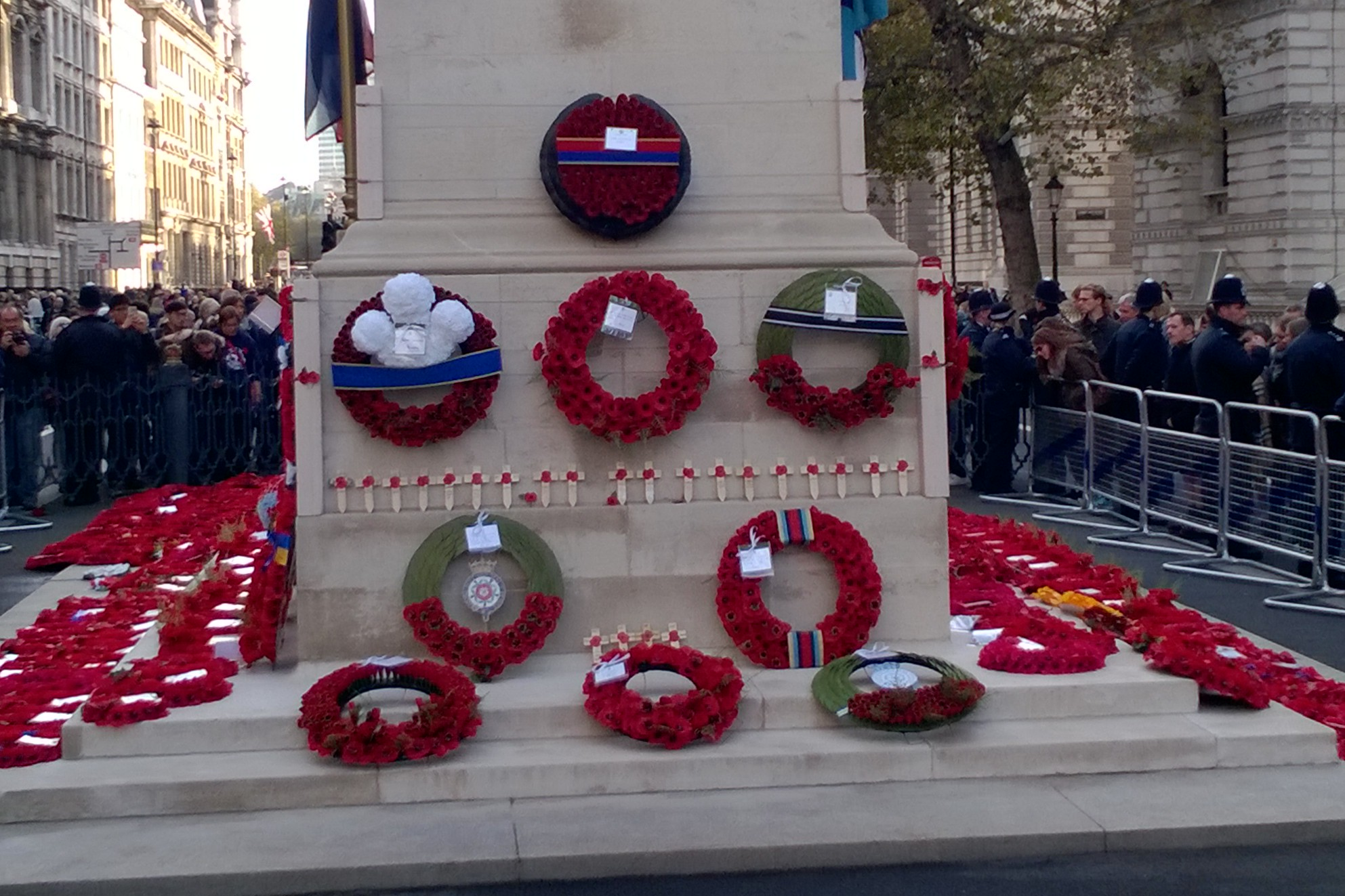
Group of wreaths laid during the Remembrance Sunday ceremony in London

A wreath laying ceremony is a traditional practice during which funeral wreaths are laid at a grave or memorial site. It is done as a formal sign of respect towards a particular tribute (e.g. Tomb of the Unknown Soldier). These are formal ceremonies that involve high ranking dignitaries such as heads of state. Once a wreath is laid, the person who lays the wreath goes a few steps back to bow/salute the memorial. During wreath laying ceremonies of a military nature, bugle calls such as "Last Post", "Taps", or "Sunset" are played.

In the Netherlands, wreath laying (Dutch: Kranslegging) is usually held during the National Remembrance Day celebrations on 4 May. During state visits, a wreath is laid out at the National Monument in Amsterdam.

In Russia, it is tradition to lay wreaths at war memorials on Days of Military Honour and commemorative military holidays, such as Defender of the Fatherland Day and Victory Day. One of the more notable laying of wreaths takes place at the Tomb of the Unknown Soldier in Moscow's Alexander Garden, where the President of Russia, the Prime Minister of Russia, members of the Federal Assembly, military officers, religious leaders in the Russian Orthodox Church and other dignitaries are led to lay a funeral wreath close to the eternal flame. A moment of silence is then conducted, which is usually followed by a solemn march of an honour guard passes.

In the United Kingdom, wreaths, are most notably laid at the Cenotaph during the National Service of Remembrance on Remembrance Day.
