= Deipnon =

Evening meal

In Greek, deipnon (Ancient Greek: δεῖπνον, deîpnon) is the evening meal, usually the largest meal of the Ancient Greek day. One famous example from the Ancient Greek sources is "Hekate's Deipnon" which is, at its most basic, a religious offering meal given to the Titan Hekate and the restless dead once a lunar month. Ancient Athenians held that once a lunar month, Hekate led the spirits of the unavenged or wrongfully killed accompanied by hounds from the underworld up from Hades. It is also the last day of the month according to the lunisolar based Attic calendar used in ancient Athens. Where the time of the dark moon was seen as the in-between liminal time between months.

== Historical practices ==
The main purpose of the Deipnon was to honor Hekate and to placate the souls in her wake who “longed for vengeance.” A secondary purpose was to purify the household and to atone for bad deeds a household member may have committed to offend Hekate, causing her to withhold her favor from them. Hekate has power over heaven, earth, and sea and is able to grant prosperity and all the blessings of daily life.

The Deipnon was celebrated on the night before the first visible sliver of moon could be seen, the night of the new moon. The new moon was the last day of the lunar month and the Deipnon rituals allowed the family to begin the new month, which they celebrated as the Noumenia. This differs from how modern astronomy calculates the new moon, so one may not follow a modern calendar to set this date.

The Deipnon consists of three main parts: 1) the meal that was set out at a crossroads, 2) an expiation sacrifice, and 3) purification of the household.

=== The meal ===
The specific foods mentioned most often in primary sources are those usually associated with offerings for the dead: raw eggs, some type of small cake, garlic, leeks and/or onions, and fish. Most families placed the meal on top of or inside the small shrine to Hekate they had outside of their door after sunset. The street in front of their house and the doorway into the home created a 3-way crossroads, sacred to Hekate. After the meal was set out, the person placing it did not look back at it, believing the restless spirits who dined became angry at anyone who looked at them; those who looked back could be driven insane. Due to roaming spirits, Athenians did not leave their homes during the night hours of the Deipnon.

Although some considered it sacrilegious, and that it would invite Hekate's wrath, persons in extreme poverty would eat the meal. "Ask Hekate whether it is better to be rich or starving; she will tell you that the rich send her a meal every month [food placed inside her door-front shrines] and that the poor make it disappear before it is even served." - Aristophanes, Plutus 410 - (trans. O'Neill) However according to a scholion on Aristophanes found in the Suda,(Suda Epsilon 363, C10th CE, trans. W. Hutton) it was widely known that the poor would take the offerings and this was even encouraged by the goddess. "From her (Hekate) one may learn whether it is better to be rich or to go hungry. For she says that those who have and who are wealthy should send her a dinner each month, but that the poor among mankind should snatch it before they put it down.' For it was customary for the rich to offer loaves and other things to Hekate each month, and for the poor to take from them."

=== Expiation ===
If the household felt they were polluted or Hekate had withdrawn her favor, they sometimes atoned for acts committed by the household, some of which they might not even be aware of, by sacrificing a dog to Hekate as a scapegoat. Prior to the sacrifice taking place, each member of the household touched the dog, transmitting all of their bad deeds onto this sacred animal of Hekate. Once the dog was sacrificed, the head of the family performed divination by reading the entrails to be sure the sacrifice was accepted and any act of offense against the Titan or the Gods was wiped clean. This ritual allowed the family to go forward into the new month free of pollution.

=== Purification ===
Purification of the household had two parts: 1) fumigation; and 2) the removal of “leftovers” from offerings and sacrifices. Fumigation was accomplished by carrying a baked clay censer of incense throughout the house and property. The clay censer was then deposited at the crossroads or shrine as an offering and was never used again. It was considered a “leftover” from the ritual. Other such leftovers included; incense ashes and the ashes from sacrifices that were on the family altar, waste blood, and any remaining food that had fallen onto the floor. Food that falls to the floor was never to be picked up as it had passed to Hekate, who would redistribute it to the spirits.

“Whatever is thrown or dropped is lost to this world, whatever is caught is gained” - Pausanias, Description of Greece I, 17, 3; Aelius Spartianus, Hadrian XXVI, 7.

This suggests how the poor may have been able to eat the meals without incurring Hekate's wrath. If the poor were able to snatch the meal up before it was set down, before it was “lost” to the spirits and to Hekate, it would be their “gain.”

All of the leftovers were deposited at the shrine or a crossroads, preferably at the same time as the meal since you were not to look back at it. Then the household shut its doors and retired for the night. As it was considered unlucky to pick up, touch, or step on these offerings, it is not clear how the offerings were disposed of after the Deipnon or if they were left alone indefinitely.

=== Other ===
Although not a religious practice, as the Deipnon was the last day of the month in the Athenian calendar, debts and obligations were due on this day.

== Current practices ==
Current methods of observing the Deipnon by modern adherents of the indigenous Athenian religion mix traditional forms of ritual with new. In some cases, the new ritual practices are due to adapting to modern life in a very different culture than that of ancient Athens. Other practices arise out of differing interpretations of Hekate's significance.

=== The meal ===
This offering is one of the more common ritual elements in current practice. Eggs, onions, garlic, and leeks are placed on plates and offered. Incense may take the place of food as the meal offering. While the make up of the meal has remained intact, the location of the offering often differs from traditional placement. Most adherents do not have a shrine to Hekate where their sidewalk or driveway meets the street in front of their home. While some still seek out a crossroads, others place the meal on a central altar in their home or apartment for a day and then dispose of the offering later.

=== Cleaning or sweeping the house ===
While offering the sweepings from the home is still done, what is in the sweepings can be much different from ancient Athens. It is no longer common practice to allow dropped food to stay on the floor for weeks. People currently do not have ashes from sacrificed animals, dog carcasses, or waste blood in homes and apartments. Stubs from candles used in rituals, ashes from incense, and other previous offerings can find their way into the pile of “sweepings,” which is offered on the Deipnon, as this is a time when some Hellenic Polytheists clean off all home altars and shrines. Cleaning out a refrigerator or pantry is another common practice.

=== Charity ===
According to Aristophanes (Plutus Aristophanes, 380 BC) and a Scholion on Aristophanes in the Suda, (Suda, Epsilon 363, C10th CE) it was commonly known that the poor would take food offerings left for Hekate and this was seen as an act of charity. Current offerings of food or money to local food banks in Hekate's name is an emerging modern devotional practice. Donating time at a soup kitchen serving meals is another act of charity and goodwill done to observe the Deipnon. Hellenic Polytheists who donate to charity during the Deipnon believe this is an ethical act keeping with Hellenic virtues, they are giving in Hekate's name so she may find them worthy of her blessings of prosperity, wisdom, and increase. Other modern adherents do not include charitable acts during the Deipnon and believe this modern practice is not in keeping with the religious intent of the Deipnon.

=== Other ===
Other practices are resolving personal and/or financial obligations and emptying and cleaning a special jar kept in a pantry or on an altar in honor of Zeus Ktesios. Both practices are based on the same general concept – to close out the old month and enter the new month fresh. That fresh start is celebrated the next day during the Noumenia when it is auspicious to start new projects and unspoiled contents are placed back into the Ktesios jar.
