= Athenian festivals =

Overview of festivals in ancient Athens

The festival calendar of Classical Athens involved the staging of many festivals each year. This includes festivals held in honor of Athena, Dionysus, Apollo, Artemis, Demeter, Persephone, Hermes, and Heracles. Other Athenian festivals were based around family, citizenship, sacrifice, and women. There were at least 120 festival days each year.

== Athena ==
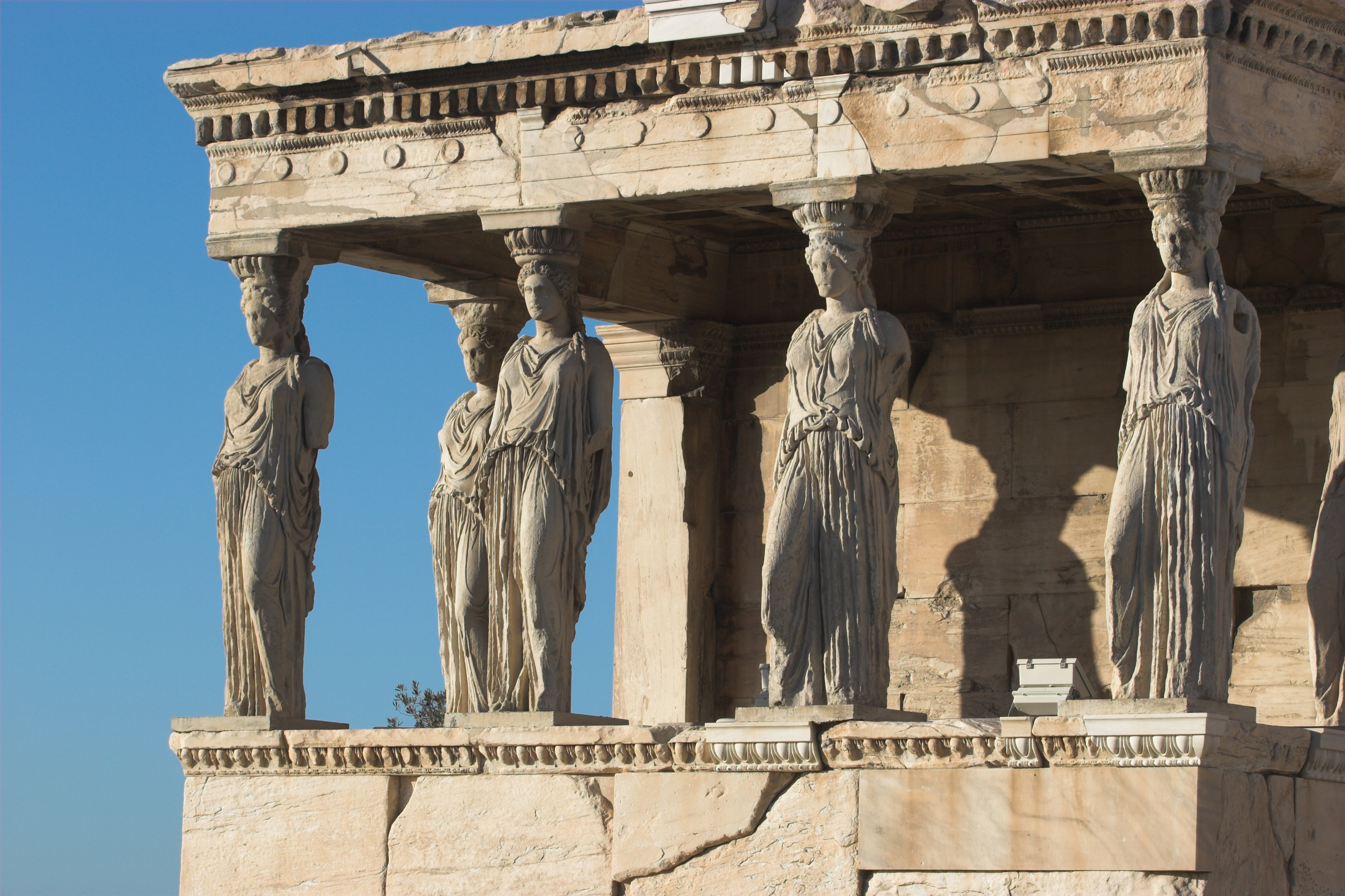
Caryatid Porch of the Erechtheion, Athens, 421–407 BCE.

The Panathenaea (Ancient Greek: Παναθήναια, "all-Athenian festival") was the most important festival for Athens and one of the grandest in the entire ancient Greek world. Except for slaves, all inhabitants of the polis could take part in the festival. This holiday of great antiquity is believed to have been the observance of Athena's birthday and honoured the goddess as the city's patron divinity, Athena Polias ('Athena of the city'). A procession assembled before dawn at the Dipylon Gate in the northern sector of the city. The procession, led by the Kanephoros, made its way to the Areopagus and in front of the Temple of Athena Nike next to the Propylaea. Only Athenian citizens were allowed to pass through the Propylaea and enter the Acropolis. The procession passed the Parthenon and stopped at the great altar of Athena in front of the Erechtheum. Every four years a newly woven peplos was dedicated to Athena.

== Dionysus ==
The Dionysia was a large religious festival in ancient Athens in honor of the god Dionysus, the central event of which was the performance of tragedies and, from 487 BCE, comedies. It was the second-most important festival after the Panathenaia. The Dionysia actually comprised two related festivals, the Rural Dionysia and the City Dionysia, which took place in different parts of the year. They were also an essential part of the Dionysian Mysteries.

The Lenaia (Ancient Greek: Λήναια) was an annual festival with a dramatic competition but one of the lesser festivals of Athens and Ionia in ancient Greece. The Lenaia took place (in Athens) in the month of Gamelion, roughly corresponding to January. The festival was in honour of Dionysus Lenaius. Lenaia probably comes from lenai, another name for the Maenads, the female worshippers of Dionysus.

The Anthesteria, one of the four Athenian festivals in honour of Dionysus (collectively the Dionysia), was held annually for three days, the eleventh to thirteenth of the month of Anthesterion (the January/February full moon); it was preceded by the Lenaia. At the centre of this wine-drinking festival was the celebration of the maturing of the wine stored at the previous vintage, whose pithoi were now ceremoniously opened, and the beginning of spring. Athenians of the Classical age were aware that the festival was of great antiquity; Walter Burkert points out that the mythic reflection of this is the Attic founder-king Theseus' release of Ariadne to Dionysus, but this is no longer considered a dependable sign that the festival had been celebrated in the Minoan period. Since the festival was celebrated by Athens and all the Ionian cities, it is assumed that it must have preceded the Ionian migration of the late eleventh or early tenth century BCE.

== Apollo and Artemis ==
The Boedromia (Ancient Greek: Βοηδρόμια) was an ancient Greek festival held at Athens on the 7th of Boedromion (summer) in the honour of Apollo Boedromios (the helper in distress). The festival had a military connotation, and thanks the god for his assistance to the Athenians during wars. It could also commemorate a specific intervention at the origin of the festival. The event in question, according to the ancient writers, could be the help brought to Theseus in his war against the Amazons, or the assistance provided to the king Erechtheus during his struggle against Eumolpus. During the event, sacrifices were also made to Artemis Agrotera.

The Thargelia (Ancient Greek: Θαργήλια) was one of the chief Athenian festivals in honour of the Delian Apollo and Artemis, held on their birthdays, the 6th and 7th of the month Thargelion (about 24 and 25 May). Essentially an agricultural festival, the Thargelia included a purifying and expiatory ceremony. While the people offered the first-fruits of the earth to the god in token of thankfulness, it was at the same time necessary to propitiate him, lest he might ruin the harvest by excessive heat, possibly accompanied by pestilence. The purificatory preceded the thanksgiving service. On the 6th a sheep was sacrificed to Demeter Chloe on the Acropolis, and perhaps a swine to the Fates, but the most important ritual was the following: Two men, the ugliest that could be found (the Pharmakoi) were chosen to die, one for the men, the other (according to some, a woman) for the women. On the day of the sacrifice they were led round with strings of figs on their necks, and whipped on the genitals with rods of figwood and squills. When they reached the place of sacrifice on the shore, they were stoned to death, their bodies burnt, and the ashes thrown into the sea (or over the land, to act as a fertilizing influence).

== Aphrodite and Adonis ==
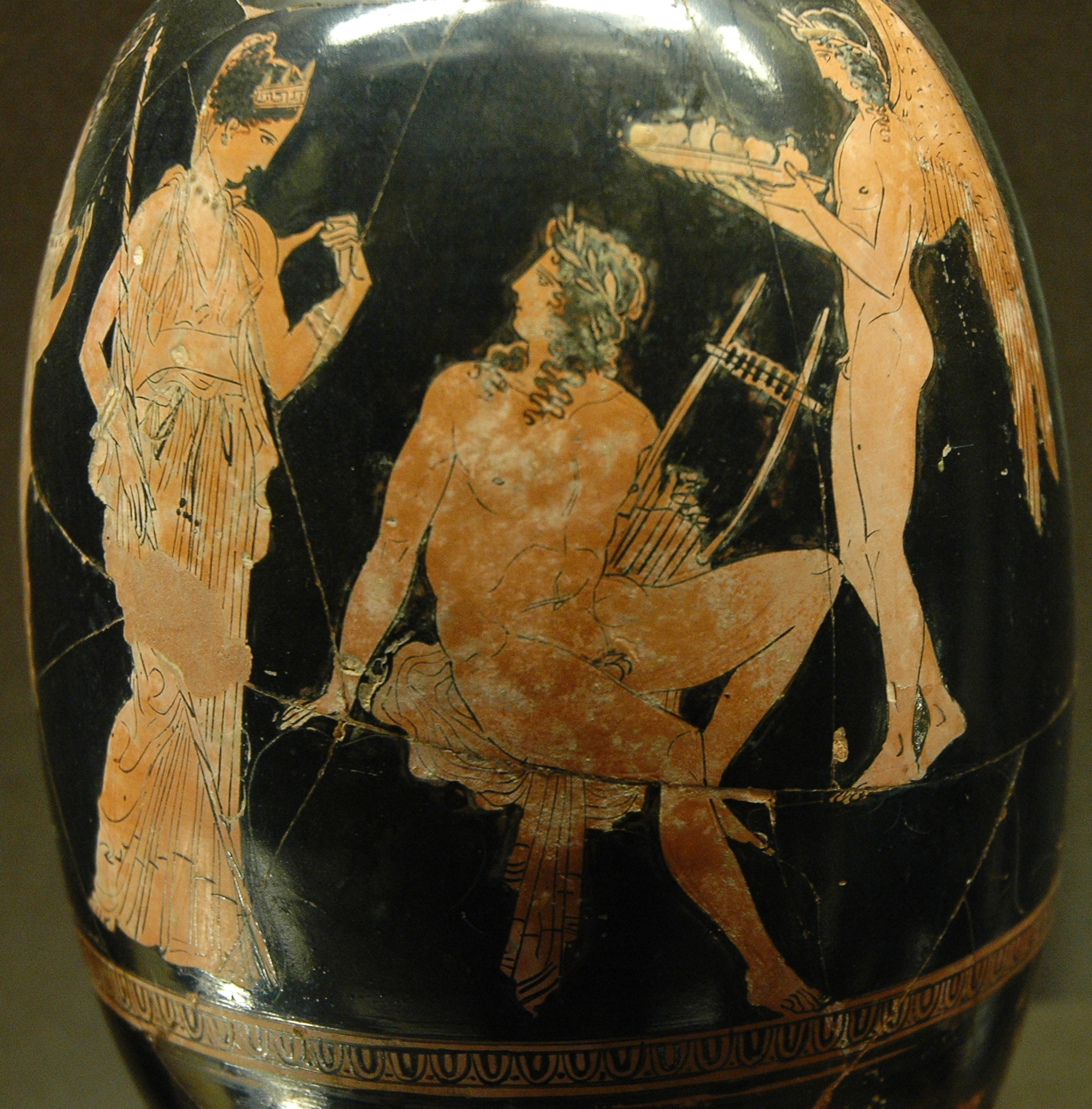
Aphrodite and her mortal lover Adonis

The Adonia (Ἀδώνια), or Adonic feasts, were ancient feasts instituted in honour of Aphrodite and Adonis, and observed with great solemnity among the Greeks, Egyptians, etc. The festival took place in the late summer and lasted between one and eight days. The event was run by women and attended exclusively by them. All Athenian women were allowed to attend, including widows, wives and unmarried women of different social classes. On the first day, they brought into the streets statues of Adonis, which were laid out as corpses; and they observed all the rites customary at funerals, beating themselves and uttering lamentations, in imitation of the cries of Aphrodite for the death of her paramour. The second day was spent in merriment and feasting; because Adonis was allowed to return to life, and spend half of the year with Aphrodite. The Adonis festival was held annually to honor the death of Adonis, Aphrodite's mortal lover who was killed by a boar. Women would participate in the festival by planting their own gardens of Adonis inside of fractured pottery vessels to transport to the rooftops where the ceremonies took place. The women would march through the city to the sea, where Adonis was born and buried. This was preceded by wailing on the rooftops that could be heard throughout the city. The Adonis was an event where women were allowed unusual freedom and independence, as they could socialize without constraint under their own terms.

== Demeter and Persephone ==
The Thesmophoria was a festival held in Greek cities, in honour of the goddesses Demeter and her daughter Persephone. The name derives from thesmoi, or laws by which men must work the land. The Thesmophoria were the most widespread festivals and the main expression of the cult of Demeter, aside from the Eleusinian Mysteries. The Thesmophoria commemorated the third of the year when Demeter abstained from her role of goddess of the harvest and growth in mourning for her daughter who was in the realm of the Underworld. Their distinctive feature was the sacrifice of pigs.

The festival of the Skira or Skirophoria in the calendar of ancient Athens, closely associated with the Thesmophoria, marked the dissolution of the old year in May/June. At Athens, the last month of the year was Skirophorion, after the festival. Its most prominent feature was the procession that led out of Athens to a place called Skiron near Eleusis, in which the priestess of Athena and the priest of Poseidon took part, under a ceremonial canopy called the skiron, which was held up by the Eteoboutadai. Their joint temple on the Acropolis was the Erechtheum, where Poseidon embodied as Erechtheus remained a numinous presence.

== Hermes ==
The Hermaea (Ancient Greek: Ἔρμαια) were ancient Greek festivals held annually in honour of Hermes, notably at Pheneos at the foot of Mt Cyllene in Arcadia. Usually the Hermaea honoured Hermes as patron of sport and gymnastics, often in conjunction with Heracles. They included athletic contests of various kinds and were normally held in gymnasia and palaestrae. The Athenian Hermaea were an occasion for relatively unrestrained and rowdy competitions for the ephebes, and Solon tried to prohibit adults from attending.

== Heracles ==
The Heracleia were ancient festivals honouring the divine hero Heracles. The ancient Athenians celebrated the festival, which commemorated the death of Heracles, on the second day of the month of Metageitnion (which would fall in late July or early August), at the Κυνοσαργες (Kynosarges) gymnasium at the demos Diomeia outside the walls of Athens, in a sanctuary dedicated to Heracles. His priests were drawn from the list of boys who were not full Athenian citizens (nothoi).

== Citizenship festivals ==
The Apaturia (Greek: Ἀπατούρια) were Ancient Greek festivals held annually by all the Ionian towns, except Ephesus and Colophon who were excluded due to acts of bloodshed. The festivals honored the origins and the families of the men who were sent to Ionia by the kings and were attended exclusively by the descendants of these men. In these festivals, men would present their sons to the clan to swear an oath of legitimacy. The oath was made to preserve the purity of the bloodline and their connection to the original settlers. The oath was followed by a sacrifice of either a sheep or a goat, and then the sons' names getting inscribed in the register.

At Athens, the Apaturia, a Greek citizenship festival took place on the 11th, 12th and 13th days of the month Pyanepsion (mid-October to mid-November). At this festival, the various phratries, or clans, of Attica met to discuss their affairs, along with initiating the sons into the clans.

== Family festivals ==
The Amphidromia was a ceremonial feast celebrated on the fifth or seventh day after the birth of a child. It was a family festival of the Athenians, at which the newly born child was introduced into the family, and children of poorer families received its name. Children of wealthier families held a naming ceremony on the tenth day called dekate. This ceremony, unlike the Amphidromia, was open to the public by invitation. No particular day was fixed for this solemnity; but it did not take place very soon after the birth of the child, for it was believed that most children died before the seventh day, and the solemnity was therefore generally deferred till after that period, that there might be at least some probability of the child remaining alive.

== Women in Athenian festivals ==
Athenian women were allowed to attend the majority of festivals, but often had limited participation in the festivities or feasts. They would have been escorted by a family member or husband to the male domination festivals, as it would have been seen as inappropriate for an unmarried girl or married woman to go unsupervised. Non-citizen women and slaves would be present as prostitutes or workers for the male guests, but were not included in the actual festival.

Select male festivals would include women in their festivities. Often it was high-born women who were allowed to attend the Panathenaia as basket-bearers, but would not participate in the feast itself. The public festivals of Anthesteria and Dionysia, included women both in attendance and rites of sacrifice. The festival of Argive held in honor of Hera was attended by both men and women. The men and women's involvement in Argive was close to equal, as they shared rites of feasting and sacrifice.

Athenian women held their own festivals that often excluded men, such as the Thesmophoria, Adonia, and Skira. Festivals hosted by women were not supported by the state and instead were private festivals run and funded by wealthy women. For this reason they were often hosted inside homes and held at night. The Thesmophoria was a major women's festival held in the honour of Demeter. Women's festivals were often dedicated to a goddess and were held as a way of social, religious and personal expression for women. Wealthy women would sponsor the events and elect other women to preside over the festival. Common themes of festivals hosted by women were the transitioning from a girl to a woman, as well as signs of fertility.

There were festivals held as a way to protest the power of the men in Athens, and empower the women in the community. The Skira was an example of a woman-only event that was held annually in the summer as an opposition to men. This festival was held in honor of the Goddesses Athena and Demeter, where women would eat garlic as it was linked to sexual abstinence to oppose the men in the community and their husbands.

== Sacrifice in Athenian festivals ==
Blood sacrifices were a common occurrence in Athenian festivals. Athenians used blood sacrifices to make the accord between gods and men, and it renewed the bonds of the community. Many animals were sacrificed in Athenian festivals, but the most common animals were sheep, lamb, and goat. This is because they were readily available in Athens and the cost of them was minimal. Bigger sacrifices included bulls and oxen. These animals were reserved for larger festivals like Buphonia. Goats were commonly sacrificed at the festivals of Dionysus, Apotropaiso, Lykeios, and Pythois.

Sacrifice in Athenian festivals was very formal, and the act was less focused on violence or aggression, and more focused on ritual. Women and men had very specific roles in sacrifices. Only female virgins, called kanephoroi, could lead the procession as they were required to carry the sacred implements and provisions at the sacrifices. The kanephoroi was also required to raise the ololuge, a screaming howl in which the woman would perform as the man would begin killing the animal. The men were the sacrificers; they would cut their hair as an offering, then butcher the animal on the altar. The animal would be skinned and then cooked over the altar for the participants to consume. Ritual sacrifice in Athens had three main steps: the preparation of the sacrifice, the distribution, and consumption of the sacrificial animal.

Other forms of sacrifice took place at Athenian festivals, such as food and other items. Offerings of agricultural products took place at the Proerosia, the Thargelia, the Pyanospia, the Thalysia and the Pithoigia. These offerings were made to ask for help in the production of crops and the breeding animals from Gods and Goddesses such as Demeter, Apollo, and Artemis. The offerings were more likely to happen in areas prone to frost, drought, rain and hailstorms. The offerings consisted of liquid and solid food, and was usually presented daily or at common feasts.

== Number ==
Jon D. Mikalson in his book, The Sacred and Civil Calendar of the Athenian Year, states "The total number of positively dated festival days (i.e., the total in the two lists) is 120, which constitutes 33 percent of the days of the year".

== Other known festivals ==
- Delphinia
- Haloa
- Pandia (festival)
- Synoikia
