= Hermaea =

Hermaea may be:

- Hermaea (festival), a festival in honor of Hermes
- Hermaea (gastropod), a gastropod genus in the family Hermaeidae
