= Noumenia =

New moon in ancient Greek calendars

The Noumenia (Ancient Greek: Νουμηνία, lit: new moon) is the first day of the lunar month and also a religious observance in ancient Athens and much of Greece (cf. Attic calendar).

== History ==
The Noumenia was marked when the first sliver of moon was visible and was held in honor of Selene, Apollon Noumenios, Hestia and the other Hellenic household Gods. The Noumenia was also the second day in a three-day household celebration held each lunar month; Hekate's Deipnon is on the last day before the first slice of visible moon and is the last day in a lunar month, then the Noumenia which marks the first day in a lunar month, followed by the Agathos Daimon (Good Spirits) on the second day of the Lunar month.

=== As celebrated in Athens ===
The Noumenia was considered, in the words of Plutarch, "the holiest of days" and no other religious festivals were allowed on this day, nor were any governmental meetings scheduled to take place on the Noumenia. It was a day of relaxation and feasting for Athenian citizens, at home, or for males, with religious fraternities. Wrestling matches also took place at the palaestra.

It was celebrated by a public ritual on the Acropolis and by private offerings of frankincense, flower garlands, wine, and barley cakes placed on home altars and household shrines to Hekate and Hermes, which had been freshly cleaned the day before as part of the Deipnon.

The official state rituals for this day included small offerings to gods and goddesses seen as protectors of Athens, such as Athena Polias and Poseidon, but the most important was made to the guardian snake of the city. The snake was kept at the Erechtheum, a temple housing the cult statue of Athena Polias, the mark of Poseidon Erechtheus' Trident and the salt spring, the sacred olive tree that sprouted when Athena struck the rock with her spear, and the burial places of Athens first two kings, Cecrops and Erechtheus. The snake was believed to be the living spirit of King Cecrops.

=== Other Greek cities ===
According to Herodotus, in Sparta, meat, barley meal and wine were distributed to the citizens by the Kings on the Noumenia.

== Modern practices ==
Those reviving the indigenous religions of Greece perform many of the same household religious practices and hold the Noumenia as important as their ancient counterparts. They make offerings such as incense or honey cakes to Selene, Apollon, Hestia, and their household Gods at their family altar. Other ways they mark the day include decorating their home or home altar with fresh flowers, eating a special family meal, making honey cakes, and replacing the ingredients in the kathiskos with fresh water, oil, and fruit, and bits of food. The Noumenia also considered an auspicious day to begin new projects.

== See also ==
- Athenian festivals
