= Skiron =

Skiron may refer to:

- Skiron, a lesser wind of the Anemoi in ancient Greek mythology
- Scirum, a town in ancient Attica, Greece
