= Phratry =

Group of male city-state citizens in Ancient Greece

In ancient Greece, a phratry (Ancient Greek: φρᾱτρῐ́ᾱ, romanized: phrātríā, lit. 'brotherhood, kinfolk', derived from Ancient Greek: φρᾱ́τηρ, romanized: phrā́tēr, lit. 'brother') was a group containing citizens in some city-states. Their existence is known in most Ionian cities and in Athens and it is thought that they existed elsewhere as well. Almost nothing is known about the functions and responsibilities of phratries outside Attica (the area around Athens). Within Athens, they played a prominent role in social and religious life, particularly in the major festival called the Apatouria. They played an important role in determining eligibility for Athenian citizenship and all citizens (with very few exceptions) and only citizens were enrolled in phratries. Particularly in anthropology, the term is also applied to similar descent groups of multiple clans in other societies.

== History ==
=== Origins and etymology ===
The origins of the phratry in ancient Greece are unknown. It is possible that they are Ionian in origin and that their presence in Athens stems from a known migration from Ionia in the late Mycenaean period. This was the origin explanation favored by many of the classical Athenians, including Aristotle. Some scholars also favor this explanation because phratries are known to have been present in most (but not all) of the Ionian city-states, as was the major phratry festival, the Apatouria. However, almost nothing is known about the functions or prominence of the Apatouria and the phratries in Ionian city-states. It is therefore possible that they functioned differently from the Athenian phratries and perhaps even emerged separately. The linguistic origins of the word "phratry" are quite old and date back to the Indo-European period, thus giving rise to a second origin theory for phratries: that they date back to early antiquity and originated not in Ionia but elsewhere in Greece. The term "phratry" itself is quite similar to a number of words for "brother" in languages derived from Indo-European which makes it more plausible that institutions named phratries emerged independently in Attica (where Athens is) and Ionia. The existence of the Apatouria in both Ionia and Athens complicates the second theory of origin somewhat, but at present scholars are highly uncertain about how phratries actually emerged.

=== Archaic period ===
What little we do know about phratries from before the 5th century BCE is drawn primarily from Homer and from Draco's law of homicide, which probably dates to about 620 BCE. Homer mentions phratries numerous times in his works, although never in any detail. However, their casual mention heavily implies that they were well-established by Homer's time. Draco's law of homicide, from Athens, details who can pardon a murderer. First, the immediate family of the murderer's victim has the right to pardon the murderer. If there is no immediate family, the power then passes to the extended family. If the victim also has no extended family, then the power to pardon the murderer passes to members of the victim's phratry. Since there is no further instruction on what happens if the victim was not in a phratry, scholars have generally interpreted this as meaning that, as early as the 7th century BCE, all Athenian citizens were members of a phratry. Draco's law of homicide also states that the ten most aristocratic of the phratry members would be the ones to make the decision, implying that, at this early stage in Athenian history, the phratries were dominated by the aristocratic class. This would reflect the aristocratic dominance of the broader city-state at this time.

Cleisthenes undertook a major reorganization of Athenian institutions in 508 BCE. In general, he made Athens more democratic and less aristocratic. It is known that he reorganized and reconstituted the phylai and created the demes, two other groups to which all Athenian citizens belonged. Whether or not he reformed the phratries is unknown. One leading scholar in the field, S.D. Lambert, speculates that the phratries were not involved in the military or political life or responsibilities of citizenship and that Cleisthenes only reorganized institutions in those areas. He further speculates that any change that did occur in the phratries was a reaction to the reorganization of other Athenian institutions rather than a reform undertaken directly by Cleisthenes.

=== Classical period ===
Phratries likely reached their peak importance in Athens between the 5th and 3rd centuries BCE, when we have the most extant records of them. In this time, they played a prominent role in Greek religious and social life. The number of phratries that existed during this period is unknown. The names of nine phratries are known and there are thought to have been at least thirty. There could have been as many as 140 phratries, the same as the number of demes in that period. Scholarly estimates place the Athenian citizen male population at between 20,000 and 30,000 in the 4th century BCE, which could mean phratries were as large as 1,000 adult males per phratry or as small as 140 adult males per phratry. It is also likely that different phratries were of different size and that phratries split or merged as demographic changes within them required.

With very limited exceptions, membership in a phratry was limited to adult male citizens who were descended from adult male citizen members of that phratry. The sole known exceptions were naturalized citizens, who were usually enrolled in a phratry upon gaining Athenian citizenship. Citizenship and membership were main concerns for phratries in this period and surviving texts deal extensively with questions around membership. This is likely because the qualifications for Athenian citizenship were based upon descent from Athenian citizen fathers (and later, also mothers) and phratries were one of only two institutions that kept track of descent (the other being demes).

In 451 BCE, Pericles altered the qualifications for citizenship to require a citizen to have two Athenian parents rather than just Athenian citizen fathers. As phratries were the only institutions keeping track of the parentage of females (demes concerned themselves with males only), this law elevated concern with citizenship and membership in phratries. It seems that phratries altered their qualifications for membership to match the new citizenship requirements, but it is likely that the change was phratry-by-phratry rather than an explicit part of the new citizenship law. Phratries became even more concerned with citizenship and parentage during the Peloponnesian War, when widespread migration, military service and premature death heightened the difficulty of record keeping. The biggest cache of surviving documents, the decrees of a phratry called the Demotionodai centered in a town called Decelea in northern Attica, date from this period and almost exclusively discuss membership qualifications and introduction procedures.

==== Phratry festivals ====
The biggest, most prominent and most important phratry festival was the Apatouria, a three day festival during the Athenian month of Pyanepsion. This would place the festival during October or November, depending on the year. One of the biggest festivals of the year in Athens, the Apatouria contained many different rituals within it and likely differed somewhat depending on the phratry one was a member of. Among the most important parts of the festival were the gamelia, the meion and the koureion. The gamelia was the process by which a phratry member introduced their new wife to the phratry, who welcomed and accepted her. Although females did not become phratry members, the phratry did have some supervision over the females in the households of adult male phratry members. The gamelia also gained additional importance after Pericles' new citizenship law of 451 BCE as it created a record of the history and qualifications of the wives of citizens and thus the eligibility for citizenship of their offspring.

==== Meion ====
The meion was the ceremony in which phratry members first introduced their male children to the phratry. It is unknown whether the meion took place in every phratry, but there seems to have been no fixed rule as to when a phratry member should submit his child for the meion ceremony. The koureion was the second introduction of the male offspring to the phratry and probably occurred during adolescence. After undergoing the koureion, a male was considered a full member of the phratry. At both the meion and koureion, phratry members would have had the opportunity to object to the induction of the new member if they believed his parentage was insufficient. It is unclear whether the scrutiny procedure that followed was standard for every new member or only undertaken if someone objected. It also seems that the specific procedure of the meion, koureion, and scrutiny varied by phratry. There was also an induction ceremony for females, although the details are unknown. It is also unknown whether that was a universal ceremony, or whether it was only undertaken by some phratries or some families.

==== Procedures and institutions ====
The Demotionodai decrees detail the scrutiny procedure for that phratry in the decades following the Peloponnesian War. Potential inductees and the person who introduced them for scrutiny would be fined by the phratry if the inductee was deemed to not be eligible for phratry membership. The Demotionodai decrees also state that the scrutiny of a candidate for membership should be publicized in both Athens and Decelea, probably as a result of significant phratry migration from Decelea to Athens during the Peloponnesian War. The phratry was known to operate out of a barber shop in Athens where phratry members congregated. The procedures are also very concerned with the introduction of candidates for phratry membership who do not have parents to vouch for their eligibility. This was likely a major concern of the period due to heavy death brought on both by plague and war and was probably of particular concern for the Demotionodai phratry because of its center in Decelea, a frontier area occupied by Sparta during the war.

The Demotionodai decrees also make clear that there were elected phratry officers, led by an elected patriarch. This would mark a democratic change from the aristocratic phratry leadership as implied in Draco's law centuries earlier and would mirror democratic changes in broader Athenian society. The decrees also make clear that the phratry had an independent treasury, as there were fines levied on candidates for membership who were refused membership after the scrutiny procedure. It is thought that both the elected leadership and institutional finances were common to other phratries as well and there are records of the phratries themselves acting as lending agents and landlords.

The only reliable extant records of citizens without phratry membership also date to around the time of the Peloponnesian War. Citizenship was granted to the Plataeans in 427 BCE, the Samians in 405/4 BCE and the Heroes of Phyle in 401/0 BCE, but none of these grants included enrolment in a phratry. The Plataeans were enrolled in demes, but the Samians and Heroes of Phyle were not. This suggests that these groups had somewhat limited citizenship, as membership in a phratry and deme were prerequisites to most of the privileges and duties of citizenship. It is unknown whether there were other grants of citizenship to individuals or groups that did not include phratry membership, but it is thought to have been uncommon and there are no other reliable records of citizens, naturalized or not, who were not enrolled in phratries.

=== Decline ===
Around 250 BCE, the extant references to phratries decrease quite a bit. From 250 BCE to 150 BCE the only surviving references to phratries are citizenship grants that enroll new citizens in a phratry, but it is not clear whether that means that phratries were still heavily active. Those same new citizens were also enrolled in phylai, which had been essentially dormant for centuries, although they technically still existed. After 150 BCE, citizenship grants no longer include enrollment in phratries, demes or phylai. Scholars believe that the decline of phratries is related to the decline in importance of Athenian citizenship. As Athens lost both its empire and its independence, the importance of tightly controlling Athenian citizenship and the benefits associated with citizenship heavily decreased. As phratries were tightly linked to eligibility for citizenship and participation in the duties of citizenship, it is thought that they declined as a result. Another related and complementary theory is that citizenship became more tightly linked to military service rather than descent, which had a similar effect on the phratries and their ceremonies of scrutiny and induction.

== See also ==
- Baradari (brotherhood), an institution of India and Pakistan, similar in meaning and etymology.
- Cognate
- Fraternity
- Indo-European vocabulary
