= Eiresione =

Figure in Greek mythology

In Greek mythology, Eiresione or Iresione /ˌaɪriːsiˈoʊniː/ (Greek: Εἰρεσιώνη, from εἶρος - eiros, "wool") was the personification of an object very important in many Greek rituals and ceremonies: a branch of olive or laurel, covered with wool, fruits, cakes and olive flasks, dedicated to Apollo and carried about by singing boys during the festivals of Pyanopsia and Thargelia, and afterwards hung up at the house door. It could only be carried by children who had two living parents. The song they were singing during the ritual was also known as "eiresione":

Eiresione for us brings figs and bread of the richest,

brings us honey in pots and oil to rub off from the body,

Strong wine too in a beaker, that one may go to bed mellow.

Greek:

εἰρεσιώνη σῦκα φέρει καὶ πίονας ἄρτους

καὶ μέλι ἐν κοτύλῃ καὶ ἔλαιον ἀποψήσασθαι

καὶ κύλικ᾽ εὔζωρον, ὡς ἂν μεθύουσα καθεύδῃ.

Eiresione signified the advent of wealth (Greek: πλοῦτος - ploutos).
