= Pyanopsia =

Religious festival in Athens, Greece

Pyanopsia /ˌpaɪəˈnɒpʃə, -ˈnɒpsiə/ (Πυανόψια) or Pyanepsia /ˌpaɪəˈnɛpʃə, -ˈnɛpsiə/ (Πυανέψια) was an ancient Athenian festival held in honor of Apollo in Athens on the 7th day of the month Pyanepsion (October/November). Its name literally means "bean-stewing", in reference to one of the sacred offerings given during this time, and is taken from the Greek words πύανος - pyanos "bean" and ἕψειν - hepsein "to boil".

== Mythical context ==
The Pyanopsia is linked to Theseus, the mythical king and founder-hero of Athens. In specific, the festival is linked to one of the Six Labours of Theseus, which was to kill the Minotaur on the Greek island of Crete. Before facing the Minotaur Theseus promised a thank offering to Apollo in rewards for favoring him during his quest. As a result of Apollo's divine favor, it is said that Theseus established the Pyanopsia, a tradition which was later continued by his hero-cult. The offerings given during the festival also relate to this founding myth, as Theseus' promised thanks came in the form of the eiresione (εἰρεσιώνη). The bean stew is related to the meal prepared by Theseus' crew following their landing back in Attica.

Theseus' status in the cultic calendar of Athens, as represented by festivals such as the Pyanepsion, is unique given the fact that Theseus is inherently an outsider to the Athenians, being born in Megara. Theseus, despite his status as a foreign entity in an intensely nationalistic city-state (he would later be named an honorary citizen in the 5th century BCE), became representative of many essential Athenian traits. In fact, it has even been proposed that his actions in and his journey to Crete came to represent the naval power of the Athenians after the Persian Wars. This reveals the dynamic nature of Athenian festivals, as new understandings and depictions of founding myths may in turn lead to new understandings of the festival. The Pyanopsia and other Theseus-based Greek festivals may not have only symbolically thanked Apollo for his actions and agricultural abundance, but also represented the values of their founders. The Pyanopsia also involved the worship of the Horae - the daughters of Themis, the goddess of divine law and order. By being worshipped at the Pyanopsia and a spring festival called the Thargelia, the Horai – Eunomia (well ordering) and Dike (right and justice) – are revealed as being connected to agriculture and vegetation.

== Offerings ==
There were two offerings given to Apollo by the people of Athens during the Pyanopsia. One of these offerings came in the form of a stew made of boiled beans, grains, and other vegetables and cereals. This stew would have been prepared by the various households of Athens and then consumed on a community-wide basis as a part of the tradition of public-feasting in Athens. Athenian festivals were seen to be done in benefit to the state. The Attic calendar was one marked by frequent festivals to the gods which offered some form of divine patronage or assistance for Athenian state as a whole. In performing acts such as preparing and eating the Pyanopsia, Athenian citizens and those who participated across Attica were making use of a tradition whereby private actions were done to help the state as a whole. To be considered a proper and functioning Athenian, participation in civic feasting by both men and women was essential. By taking part in the preparation and consumption of the stew, Athenian men and their family members not only represented the agricultural abundance of the state and gave thanks to the gods, but also reinforced their status.

The other offering was the eiresione - εἰρεσιώνη. The eiresione was a branch of olive bound with purple or white wool, and hung with various fruits of the season, pastries, small jars of honey, oil, and wine, all of which served as symbols of agricultural abundance in thanks to Apollo. The fact that the eiresione is principally composed of an olive branch is of great importance. Due to its connections with Athena and the importance of olives to the wealth and success of the city of Athens, olive branches were seen as a representative of life and therefore vital to the spread of blessings to the people of Athens. The eiresione served as the most prominent example of the olive branch serving in such a capacity due to its prominence in the procession. In understanding the eiresione in such a way, the connections between the offerings given at the Pyanopsia and the success of the city are elucidated. According to Chisholm, "it was intended as a thank-offering for blessings received, and at the same time as a prayer for similar blessings and protection against evil in future; hence, it was called a suppliant branch (εἶρος)." The principal eirisione was carried in a procession by a group of singing boys who carried it to the Athenian Temple of Apollo, where it was suspended on the gate. Smaller eirsiones were also left by the boys on private households, in return for which the boys would receive presents. The branch was said to bring good fortune to the homes at which it was left, and would have been replaced on an annual basis during next year's Pyanopsia. There was also a chant sung during the procession which was recorded by Plutarch and went as follows: "Eiresin carries figs and rich cakes; Honey and oil in a jar to anoint the limbs; And pure wine, that she may be drunken and go to sleep"." In this song, the eiresione is effectively personified. By personifying the branch it was awarded special importance showing how the olive tree, an important cultic image of Athena and therefore the city of Athens, is connected to the success and fortune of the city and its denizens.

During the Pyanopsia, the Athenians seem to have also venerated the Horae (the goddesses of the seasons) and Helios, the god of the sun, with a feast as gods with connection to agriculture; a procession in their honour is attested, separate from the one at the Thargelia, and perhaps related to the Pyanopsia.

== Significance and connections ==
The Pyanopsia is connected to other Greek Festivals. One such festival is the Thargelia, another Attic agricultural festival related to the god Apollo, which occurred in the Spring. Just as at the Pyanopsia, the Thargelia was staged by children of Athens who performed offerings with musical features, connected to the song sang at the Pyanopsia. An additional festival which the Pyanopsia seemingly resembles is the Procession of the Girls festival performed in Sparta. Though in a different region of Greece and occurring in modern-day May, the festival bears a number of striking resemblances to the Pyanopsia. The Procession of the Girls involved Spartan women bringing offerings to the altar of Artemis at Orthia, whilst singing a hymn.

The Pyanopsia is also connected to a common Greek practice of offering firstlings - the first and foremost produce of agriculture - to the Gods. The festival also gave its name to the month in which it occurred, Pyanepsion. The name Pyanopsia derives from the Greek term "pyana" which meant the "cooked beans" which were given to all members of an Athenian household during this festival. The Pyanopsia is also related to the buildings of the Ancient Athenian city center. During his time as king of Athens, Theseus constructed two buildings - the Bouleuterion and the Prytaneion - though only remains of the Prytaneion are still present. It is of special notice that even when much of the business of the old Agora, where the buildings were located, moved to the new Agora, the Prytaneion maintained the function of housing the Archon. The importance of this building is connected to its "sacred hearth" which is where the Pyanopsia departed from, emphasizing the sacred nature of the festival and its connections to the city.
