= Apaturia =

Religious festival in ancient Athens

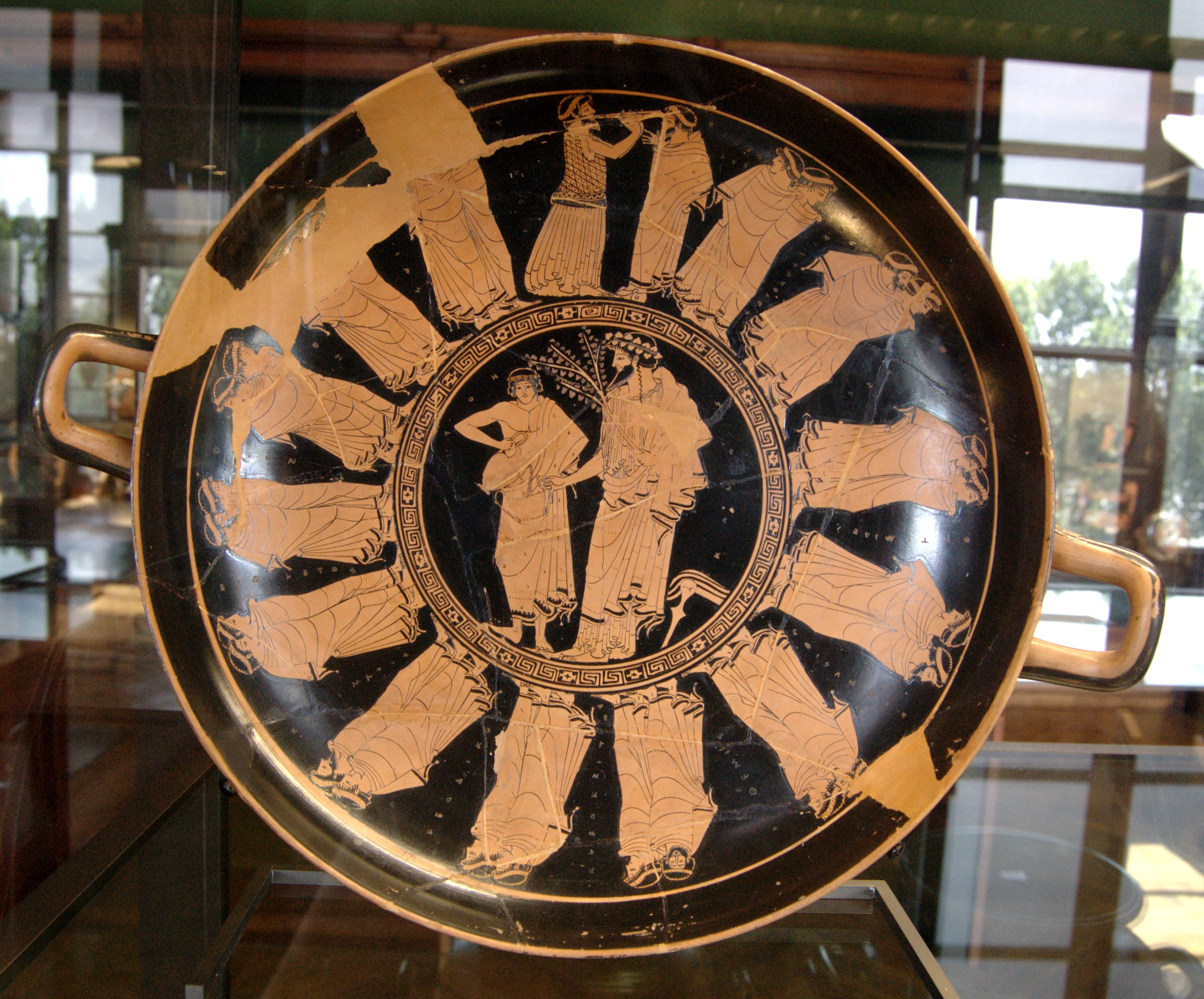
Procession of men (Apaturia?), Attic red-figure kylix, c. 480 BC, Louvre (G 138)

Apaturia (Greek: Ἀπατούρια) were ancient Greek festivals held annually by all the Ionian towns, except Ephesus and Colophon. At Athens the Apaturia took place on the 11th, 12th and 13th days of the month of Pyanepsion (mid-October to mid-November), on which occasion the various phratries, or clans, of Attica met to discuss their affairs.

The name is a slightly modified form of ἁπατόρια or ἁμαπατόρια, ὁμοπατόρια, the festival of "common relationship". The ancient folk etymology associated it with ἀπάτη ("apátē," "deceit"), a legend claiming that the festival originated in 1100 BC as a commemoration of a single combat between a certain Melanthus, representing King Thymoetes of Attica, and King Xanthus of Boeotia, in which Melanthus successfully threw his adversary off his guard by crying that a man in a black goat skin (identified with Dionysus) was helping him.

On the first day of the festival, called Dorpia or Dorpeia (Δορπεία), banquets were held towards evening at the meeting-place of the phratries or in the private houses of members. On the second, Anarrhysis (from ἀναρρύειν, "to draw back the victim's head"), a sacrifice of oxen was offered at the public cost to Zeus Phratrius and Athena.

On the third day, Kureōtis (κουρεῶτις), children born since the last festival were presented by their fathers or guardians to the assembled phratores, and, after an oath had been taken as to their legitimacy and the sacrifice of a goat or a sheep, their names were inscribed in the register. The name κουρεῶτις is derived either from κοῦρος, "young man", i.e., the day of the young, or less probably from κείρω, "to shear", because on this occasion young people cut their hair and offered it to the gods. The sacrificial animal was called μείον. The children who entered puberty also made offerings of wine to Hercules. On this day also it was the custom for boys still at school to declaim pieces of poetry, and to receive prizes.

According to Hesychius, these three days of the festival were followed by a fourth, called ἐπίβδα, but this is merely a general term for the day after any festival.

== See also ==
- Athenian festivals
