= Delphinia =

Religious festival in ancient Greece

The Delphinia was a festival of Apollo Delphinius held annually on the 6th (or 7th) of the month Mounuchiōn (April/May) in ancient Athens.

All that is known of the ceremonies is that a number of girls proceeded to his temple (Delphinium) carrying suppliant's branches and seeking to propitiate Apollo, probably as a god having influence on the sea. It was at this time of year that navigation began again after the storms of winter. According to the story in Plutarch (Theseus, 18), Theseus, before setting out to Crete to slay the Minotaur, repaired to the Delphinium and deposited, on his own behalf and that of his companions on whom the lot had fallen, an offering to Apollo, consisting of a branch of consecrated olive, bound about with white wool; after which he prayed to the god and set sail. The sending of the maidens to propitiate the god during the Delphinia commemorates this event in the life of Theseus.

== See also ==
- Athenian festivals
