= Thargelia =

Ancient Athenian religious festival

Thargelia /θɑːrˈdʒiːliə/ (Ancient Greek: Θαργήλια) was one of the chief Athenian festivals in honour of the Delian Apollo and Artemis, held on their birthdays, the 6th and 7th of the month Thargelion (about May 24 and May 25).

Essentially an agricultural festival, the Thargelia included a purifying and expiatory ceremony. While the people offered the first-fruits of the earth to the god in token of thankfulness, it was at the same time necessary to propitiate him, lest he might ruin the harvest by excessive heat, possibly accompanied by pestilence. The purificatory preceded the thanksgiving service. On the 6th a sheep was sacrificed to Demeter Chloe on the Acropolis, and perhaps a swine to the Fates, but the most important ritual was the following. Two men, the ugliest that could be found (the Pharmakoi) were chosen to die, one for the men, the other (according to some, a woman) for the women. Hipponax claims that on the day of the sacrifice they were led round with strings of figs on their necks, and whipped on the genitals with rods of figwood and squills. When they reached the place of sacrifice on the shore, they were stoned to death, their bodies burnt, and the ashes thrown into the sea (or over the land, to act as a fertilizing influence). However, it is unclear how accurate Hipponax's sixth-century, poetical account of the ceremony is, and there is much scholarly debate as to its reliability.

The Athenians, having taken the festival from the Delians, brought to it the gods of summer heat, that is the Horae, goddesses of the seasons, and Helios, the sun god, to whom they offered the first fruits of the summer crops, and cereal all dependent on Helios and the Horae for ripening; a surviving inscription mentions offerings to "Helios, Horae and Apollo". They were honored with a procession of which no details survive.

It is supposed that an actual human sacrifice took place on this occasion, replaced in later times by a milder form of expiation. Thus, at Leucas a criminal was annually thrown from a rock into the sea as a scapegoat, but his fall was checked by live birds and feathers attached to his person, and men watched below in small boats, who caught him and escorted him beyond the boundary of the city. Nevertheless, many modern scholars reject this, arguing that the earliest source for the pharmakos (the iambic satirist Hipponax) shows the pharmakos being beaten and stoned, but not executed. A more plausible explanation would be that sometimes they were executed and sometimes they weren't depending on the attitude of the victim. For instance a deliberate unrepentant murderer would most likely be put to death. Similarly, at Massilia, on the occasion of some heavy calamity (plague or famine), one of the poorest inhabitants volunteered as a scapegoat. For a year he was fed up at the public expense, then clothed in sacred garments, led through the city amidst execrations, and cast out beyond the boundaries.

The ceremony on the 7th was of a cheerful character. All kinds of first-fruits were carried in procession and offered to the god, and, as at the Pyanepsia (or Pyanopsia), branches of olive bound with wool, borne by children, were affixed by them to the doors of the houses. These branches, originally intended as a charm to avert failure of the crops, were afterwards regarded as forming part of a supplicatory service. On the second day choruses of men and boys took part in musical contests, the prize for which was a tripod. Further, on this day adopted persons were solemnly received into the genos and phratria of their adoptive parents.

== See also ==
- Eiresione
