= Hermaea (festival) =

Festival held in honour of Hermes

The Hermaea (Greek: Ἕρμαια) were ancient Greek festivals held annually in honour of Hermes, notably at Pheneos at the foot of Mt Cyllene in Arcadia. Usually the Hermaea honoured Hermes as patron of sport and gymnastics, often in conjunction with Heracles. They included athletic contests of various kinds and were normally held in gymnasia and palaestrae. The Athenian Hermaea were an occasion for relatively unrestrained and rowdy competitions for the ephebes, and Solon tried to prohibit adults from attending. In the Cretan city of Cydonia, the festival had a more Saturnalian character, as the social order was inverted and masters waited on their slaves. Apart from the Hermaea at Pheneos, Athens, and Cydonia, various sources attest the celebration of Hermaea at Salamis Island in Attica, at Tanagra in Boeotia, at Pellene in Achaea, in Laconia, at Argos (where they took place during the month of Hermaios), on Delos, at Teos, at Pergamum, in the Thracian Chersonese, at Odessos, and at Hermaion on the Bosphorus.
