= Faliscan =

Faliscan may refer to:

- Falisci, an ancient Italic people
- Faliscan language
