= Scirum =

Scirum or Skiron (Ancient Greek: Σκίρον) or Skira (Σκίρα) was a small place in ancient Attica near a torrent of the same name, just outside the Athenian walls on the Sacred Way. It was not a demus, and derived its name from Scirus, a prophet of Dodona, who fell in the battle between the Eleusinii and Erechtheus, and was buried in this spot.

Scirum's site is unlocated.
