= Attic calendar =

Lunisolar calendar

The Attic calendar or Athenian calendar is the lunisolar calendar beginning in midsummer with the lunar month of Hekatombaion, in use in ancient Attica, the ancestral territory of the Athenian polis. It is sometimes called the Greek calendar because of Athens's cultural importance, but it is only one of many ancient Greek calendars.

Although relatively abundant, the evidence for the Attic calendar is still patchy and often contested. As it was well known in Athens and of little use outside Attica, no contemporary source set out to describe the system as a whole. Further, even during the well-sourced 5th and 4th centuries BC, the calendar underwent changes, not all perfectly understood. As such, any account given of it must be a tentative reconstruction.

== Local focus ==
The Attic calendar was an exclusively local phenomenon, used to regulate the internal affairs of the Athenians, with little relevance to the outside world. For example, just across the border in Boeotia, the months had different names, and the year even began in midwinter. In Athens, the year began six months later, just after midsummer. Furthermore, while Greek months were supposed to begin with the first sighting of the new moon, it was determined locally and with a degree of variability. In many years, the months in the two communities would have more or less coincided, but there is no sign that they tried to keep the days of the month exactly aligned, as they would have seen no reason to do so.

The divide between these neighbouring calendars perhaps reflected the traditional hostility between the two communities. Had the Boeotians been speakers of an Ionic dialect, the one spoken in Athens, there would have been overlap in the names of months. An example is the island of Delos, where the calendar shared four out of twelve month-names with Athens, but not in the same places in the year. There, even though the island was under some degree of Athenian control from around 479 to 314 BC, the year started, as with the Boeotians, at midwinter.

== More than one calendar ==
Athenians lived under a number of simultaneous calendars that were used to fix days for different purposes. How much each calendar meant to individuals probably depended on how they lived. They may be set out as follows:

- A lunisolar festival calendar of 12 months based on the cycle of the moon and accommodating the solar year
- A democratic state calendar of 10 arbitrary months
- An agricultural calendar of seasons using star risings to fix points in time

=== Festival calendar (lunisolar) ===
==== Intercalation ====
The year was meant to begin with the first sighting of the new moon after the summer solstice. Ideally, the solstice would occur toward the end of Skirophorion, the final month of the year.

The new year would then begin on the day after the first sliver of the new moon was seen (or presumed to be seen). However, because the relation of these two events, solstice and new moon, is variable, the date of the new year (in relation to a Gregorian date) could move by up to a month.

This linking of solar and lunar years defines the calendar as lunisolar. Because 12 lunar months are approximately 11 days shorter than a solar year, using a purely lunar calendar (such as the Islamic one) removes any relation between the months and the seasons, causing the months to creep backwards over the seasons. By tying the start of their year to the summer solstice Athenians forced the months to relate, with some elasticity, to the seasons.

In order to deal with the 11-day difference between 12 lunar months and 1 solar cycle, when it was judged that the months had slid back enough (roughly every three years), an extra month was intercalated, leading to a leap year with about 384 days in it. The extra month was achieved by repeating an existing month so that the same month name was used twice in a row. The sixth month, Poseideon, is most frequently mentioned as the month that was repeated; however months 1, 2, 7, and 8 (Hekatombaiōn, Metageitniōn, Gameliōn, and Anthesteriōn) are also attested as being doubled.

Various cycles were in existence for working out exactly which years needed to add a thirteenth month. A nineteen-year cycle, the Metonic cycle, was developed in Athens by the astronomers Meton and Euctemon (known to be active in 432 BC), and could have been used to pattern the insertion of leap years to keep the lunar and solar years aligned with some accuracy. There is, however, no sign that any such system was in fact used in Athens, whose calendar seems to have been administered on an ad hoc basis.

==== Names of months ====
The primary function of this calendar was to set the days for the religious festivals. In a county fair role, they encompassed a much broader range of activities than the word "religious" suggests and were central to the life of the city.

The Athenian months were named after major festivals. In this the calendar differed from the Mesopotamian models that lie behind all Greek lunar calendars. In the Sumerian and Babylonian prototypes, for instance, the months were named after the main agricultural activity practiced in that month. Many Athenian festivals had links with different stages of the agricultural cycle, such as festivals of planting or harvest. It perhaps added to the need to keep lunar and solar calendars roughly aligned. The farming year, however, was not the primary focus of the calendar.

The sixth month and its festival – Poseideon and Poseideia – took its name directly from the god Poseidon. More commonly, gods appear under epithets, e.g. Maimakterion and Maimakteria, named after Zeus Maimaktes ("Zeus the Stormy").

Many of the naming festivals quickly lost importance or stopped being celebrated altogether, and some of the grandest celebrations in the life of the city are not recognised in month names, e.g. Great Dionysia, held in Elaphebolion. The months also changed names with time, e.g. Hekatombaion used to be called Kronios, after the festival Kronia.

The calendars of the Ionian cities of Asia Minor (along the western coastline of modern Turkey) often share month names with Athens. For instance, at Miletos four of the same month names were in use, namely Thargelion, Metageitnion, Boedromion and Pyanepsion, and the last of these even occupied the same position as month four in both communities. Traditionally, these Ionian cities were founded by colonists from Attica (perhaps around 1050 BC). It may be then that the Athenian month names refer to a festival schedule some hundreds of years out of date.

===== List of months =====
The correlation suggested here between the Athenian months and those of the Gregorian calendar is loose, and, in some years, it might have been off by over a month.

Summer (Θέρος)
1	Hekatombaiōn (Ἑκατομβαιών)	July/August
2	Metageitniōn (Μεταγειτνιών)	August/September
3	Boēdromiōn (Βοηδρομιών)	September/October
Autumn (Φθινόπωρον)
4	Pyanepsiōn (Πυανεψιών)	October/November
5	Maimaktēriōn (Μαιμακτηριών)	November/December
6	Poseideōn (Ποσειδεών)	December/January
Winter (Χεῖμα)
7	Gamēliōn (Γαμηλιών)	January/February
8	Anthestēriōn (Ἀνθεστηριών)	February/March
9	Elaphēboliōn (Ἐλαφηβολιών)	March/April
Spring (Ἔαρ)
10	Mounuchiōn (Μουνυχιών)	April/May
11	Thargēliōn (Θαργηλιών)	May/June
12	Skirophoriōn (Σκιροφοριών)	June/July

==== Days of the month ====
The months were 29 or 30 days in length, loosely in alternation, since the Moon orbits the Earth in roughly 29.5 days. However, rather than following a set scheme (such as the popular rhyme "Thirty days hath September..."), the duration of each month was declared just before month's end in an attempt to latch the first of the following month onto the upcoming new moon. The short months of 29 days were known as "hollow" and the ones with 30 days as "full".

Each month was divided into three phases of ten days associated with the waxing moon, the full moon and the waning moon. The naming of the days was complex. The first day of the month was simply noumenia or new moon, a name used in virtually every Greek calendar. From there the days were numbered up to the 20th day. For the final third of the month the numbering turned around to do a countdown from ten to the last day. Only the middle phase had numbers for the days running higher than 10 and even these were often phrased as "the third over ten" and so forth. In the wings of the month, the numbered days ran 2–10 and then 10–2. Days in these sections were distinguished from each other by adding the participle "waxing" and "waning" to the month name. In the centre of the month with its unambiguous numbering there was no need for this, though later the term "of the middling month" was used. The final day of the month was called henē kai nea, "the old and the new". Peculiar to Athens, this name presents the day as bridging the two moons or months. Elsewhere in Greece this day was usually called the 30th.

Athenian festivals were divided between the 80 or so annually recurring celebrations and a set of monthly holy days clustered around the beginning of each month. They were often the birthdays of gods, the Greeks thinking of birthdays as a monthly rather than a yearly recurrence. Every month, days 1–4 and 6–8 were all sacred to particular gods or divine entities, amounting to some 60 days a year:

- Day 1: The day the moon (waxing cressent) is first visible after the New Moon, Noumenia.
- Day 2: Agathos Daimon
- Day 3: Athena Tritogeneia's Birthday
- Day 4: Heracles, Hermes, Aphrodite and Eros
- Day 6: Artemis' Birthday
- Day 7: Apollo's Birthday
- Day 8: Poseidon and Theseus
- Day 9: Rhea and Muses
- Day 20: Apollo Eikadios (of the twentieth) and Athena
- 29th or 30th day (depending on the month being hollow or full): Hekate ( Hekateia or Hekate's Deipna ) and the dead ancestors ( Nekysia )

Monthly and annual festivals were not usually allowed to fall on the same days so every festival month had an opening phase with exactly recurrent practices and celebrations while in the body of each month was a unique schedule of festival days.

A parallel function of this calendar was the positioning of the perhaps 15 or so forbidden days on which business should not be transacted.

Rather than considering the month as a simple duration of thirty days, the three-part numbering scheme focuses on the Moon itself. In particular the waning days 10–2 and the waxing days 2–10 frame the crucial moment where the moon vanishes and then reappears.

A date under this scheme might be "the third (day) of Thargelion waning", meaning the 28th day of Thargelion.

Names of the days of the month
Moon waxing	Moon full	Moon waning
New Month	11th	later 10th
2nd waxing	12th	9th waning
3rd waxing	13th	8th waning
4th waxing	14th	7th waning
5th waxing	15th	6th waning
6th waxing	16th	5th waning
7th waxing	17th	4th waning
8th waxing	18th	3rd waning
9th waxing	19th	2nd waning
10th waxing	earlier 10th	old and new [moon]

To summarise the days with special names.

- The first day: noumenia, or first visible waxing cressent after the new moon.
- The last day: henē kai nea, the "old and the new".
- The 21st day: "the later tenth". The Attic month had three days named "tenth" (equivalent in a straight sequence to the 10th, 20th, and 21st days). These were distinguished as
  - 10th: "the tenth (of the month) waxing"
  - 20th: "the earlier tenth" (i.e. waning)
  - 21st: "the later tenth" (i.e. waning)

This strange juxtapositioning of the two days called the tenth, the earlier and the later, further highlighted the shift into the moon's waning phase.

When a month was to last 29 instead of 30 days (a "hollow" month), the last day of the month ("the old and new") was pulled back by one day. That is to say, the "second day of the waning month" (the 29th in straight sequence) was renamed as month's end.

=== State calendar ===
As Ionians, the Athenians had always been divided into four tribes. Although the tribes were never abolished, one of the key reforms at the creation of democracy after 506 BC was to distribute citizens under a new system of ten tribes to try to ensure even participation across the whole community. From then on, ten became a kind of hallmark number for the democracy, as so much citizen activity was done through the ten tribes. (For instance, the 10 generals leading the 10 regiments, the 10 sets of public arbitrators, the 10 treasurers of the Delian league and so on.)

This decimal ordering extended to the creation of a supplementary calendar with ten months. Each year, each tribe contributed 50 members to the council of 500 (boule), which played an important role in the administration of the city. For one tenth of the year, each tribal fifty was on duty, with a third of them in the council chamber at all times as an executive committee for the state. Their period of office was known as a 'prytany' or state month.

In the 5th century, the calendar was solar-based by using a year of 365 or 366 days and paying no attention at all to the phases of the moon. One likely arrangement is that the ten prytanies were divided between six months of 37 days followed by four months of 36 days. That would be parallel to the arrangement in the 4th century explained below.

From several synchronized datings that survive, it is evident that the political and the festival years did not have to begin or end on the same days. The political new year is attested 15 days either way from the start of the festival year. The system is known from the 420s; whether it had been in place from the beginning of the ten-month system is not clear.

However, in 407 BC the two calendars were synchronized to start and end on the same days. Hereafter as described in the 4th century Constitution of the Athenians the civic year was arranged as follows:

- Months 1–4 lasted 36 days (39 in leap years?)
- Months 5–10 lasted 35 days (38 in leap years?)

In years with an extra month intercalated into the festival calendar, the political months were probably lengthened to 39 and 38 days, a method that would have maintained the balance between the tribes. Evidence, however, is lacking.

In the Macedonian period (307/306 – 224/223 BC), with twelve tribes (and the prytanies), evidence shows that the month and the prytany were not coterminous and that, in general, the six first prytanies had 30 days and the last six had 29 days and that in an intercalary year, the 384 days are equally subdivided. (Meritt, 1961: Ch.VI)

In the Thirteen Phylai period (224/223 – 201/200 BC), it would be expected that in an intercalary year prytanies and months must have been fairly evenly matched and that in an ordinary year, the conciliar year was made up of three prytanies of 28 days followed by ten prytanies of 27 days, but there is strong evidence that the first prytany had usually 27 days. (Meritt, 1961: Ch.VII)

The political months had no name but were numbered and given in conjunction with the name of the presiding tribe (which, as determined by lot at the expiry of their predecessors' term, gave no clue as to the time of year). The days were numbered with a straightforward sequence, running from 1 to the total number of days for that month.

One of the main roles of the civic calendar was to position the four assembly meetings to be held each prytany. If possible, assembly meetings were not held on festival days, including the monthly festival days clustered at the start of each month. As a result, the meetings were bunched slightly toward the end of the month and made to dodge especially the larger festivals.

A date under this calendar might run "the 33rd day in the 3rd prytany, that of the tribe Erechtheis", the style used in Athenian state documents (surviving only as inscriptions). Sometimes, however, a dating in terms of the festival calendar is added as well.

==== Manipulation ====
The Attic calendar was determined on the ground, month by month and year by year, in the light of immediate concerns, political or military. It was in the control of magistrates, who were not astronomers. How heavyhanded the interference was is controversial. Some scholars believe that if a festival date fell on a day needed for an assembly meeting, an extra day could be inserted by simply repeating the same day name.

There is clear evidence that it was done later. In Athens in 271 BC, just before the Great Dionysia, four days were inserted between Elaphebolion 9 and 10, putting the calendar on hold. Presumably, it was to gain extra rehearsal time for the festival with its performances of tragedy and comedy. A similar story comes from the 5th century BC but at Argos: the Argives, launching a punitive expedition in the shadow of the holy month of Karneios when fighting was banned, decided to freeze the calendar to add some extra days of war. However, their allies rejected the rearrangement and went home.

Aristophanes' Clouds, a comedy from 423 BC, contains a speech whose complaint is brought from the Moon: the Athenians have been playing round with the months, "running them up and down" so that human activity and the divine order are completely out of kilter: "When you should be holding sacrifices, instead you are torturing and judging." A situation is known to have applied in the 2nd century BC, when the festival calendar was so out of sync with the actual cycles of the moon that the lunisolar date was sometimes given under two headings, one "according to the god", apparently the Moon, and the other "according to the archon", the festival calendar itself.

=== Seasonal calendar ===
A third calendar regulating Athenian lives was solar or seasonal. As such, it was fundamental for seasonal activities like farming and sailing. Within the broad divisions of the seasons, it relied on star risings and settings to mark more precise points in time. Star risings are the days when particular stars or constellations that have been below the horizon during hours of darkness first appear after sunset. Different star risings were keyed to various farm tasks, such as when to harvest: Hesiod in the Works and Days urges the farmer to harvest when the Pleiades rises (an event which elsewhere is set to mark the end of spring). Such a system was part of general Greek tradition, but fitted to local geography and conditions. Hesiod also uses the rising of Arcturus to mark the ending of winter and marks the start of Spring with the coming of the sparrows.

The seasons were not viewed by Greeks as dividing the year into four even blocks but rather spring and autumn were shorter tail sections of the overarching seasons, summer and winter. The divisions could be formalised by using star risings or settings in relation to the equinoxes: for instance, winter is defined in one medical text as the period between the setting of the Pleiades and the spring.

The older tradition as seen in Hesiod's Works and Days was extended by astronomical research to the creation of star calendars known as parapegmas. They were stone or wooden tablets listing a sequence of astronomical events, each with a peg hole beside it. Lines of bare peg holes were used to count the "empty days" between what were taken as the significant celestial events. Often set up in town squares (agoras), the tablets put the progression of the year on public display.

This system would have been fundamental to an individual's sense of the advancing year, but it barely intersected with the festival or state calendars. They were more civic in character and required managing to maintain their coherence with the year of the seasons. The seasonal and sidereal calendar, on the other hand, was immune to interference so Thucydides could date by the rising of Arcturus without having to wade into the confusion of disconnected city-state calendars.

== Dating events ==
The modern calendar, as well as regulating the immediate year, is part of a system of chronology that allows events to be dated far into the future and the past so a given date includes day, month and year.

By contrast, the Attic calendar had little interest in ordering the sequence of years. As in other Greek cities, the name of one of the yearly magistrates, at Athens known as the eponymous archon, was used to identify the year in relation to others. The sequence of years was matched to a list of names that could be consulted. Instead of citing a numbered year, one could locate a year in time by saying that some event occurred "when X was archon". That allowed the years to be ordered back in time for a number of generations into the past, but there was no way of dating forward beyond ordinary human reckoning (as in expressions such as "ten years from now").

There was, for instance, no use of a century divided into decades. A four-year cycle was important, which must have helped structure a sense of the passing years: at Athens, the festival of the Panathenaia was celebrated on a grander scale every fourth year as the Great Panathenaia, but that was not used as the basis of a dating system.

As both narrowly local and cyclical in focus then, the calendar did not provide a means for dating events in a comprehensible way between cities. A dating system using the four-yearly Olympiads was devised by the Greek Sicilian historian Timaeus (born c. 350 BC) as a tool for historical research, but it was probably never important on a local level.

== See also ==
- Ancient Greek astronomy
- Other ancient Greek calendars
- The Roman, Julian, and Byzantine calendars, which succeeded them
- Attic Calendar Date Converter

== Sources ==
- Burkert, W. Greek Religion. Oxford, 1985.
- Dunn, F. M. Tampering with the Calendar (Zeitschrift für Papyrologie und Epigraphik), 1999, p. 123, 213–231.
- Hannah, R. Greek and Roman Calendars: Constructions of Time in the Ancient World. London, 2005.
- Meritt, B. D. The Athenian Year. Berkeley, 1961.
- Mikalson, J. D. The Sacred and Civil Calendar of the Athenian Year. Princeton, 1975.
- Planeaux, C.S. The Athenian Year Primer: Attic Time-Reckoning and the Julian Calendar. Washington D.C. 2021.
- Pritchett, W. K. and O. Neugebauer. The Calendars of Athens. Athens, 1947.
- Samuel, Alan E. Greek and Roman Chronology, Muenchen: Beck'sche, 1972
- Oxford Classical Dictionary, 2nd edition, 1996: Calendar, Meton, Euctemon, Time reckoning, Birthday.
