= Parthenon mosque =

Former mosque in Athens

Parthenon mosque(s)
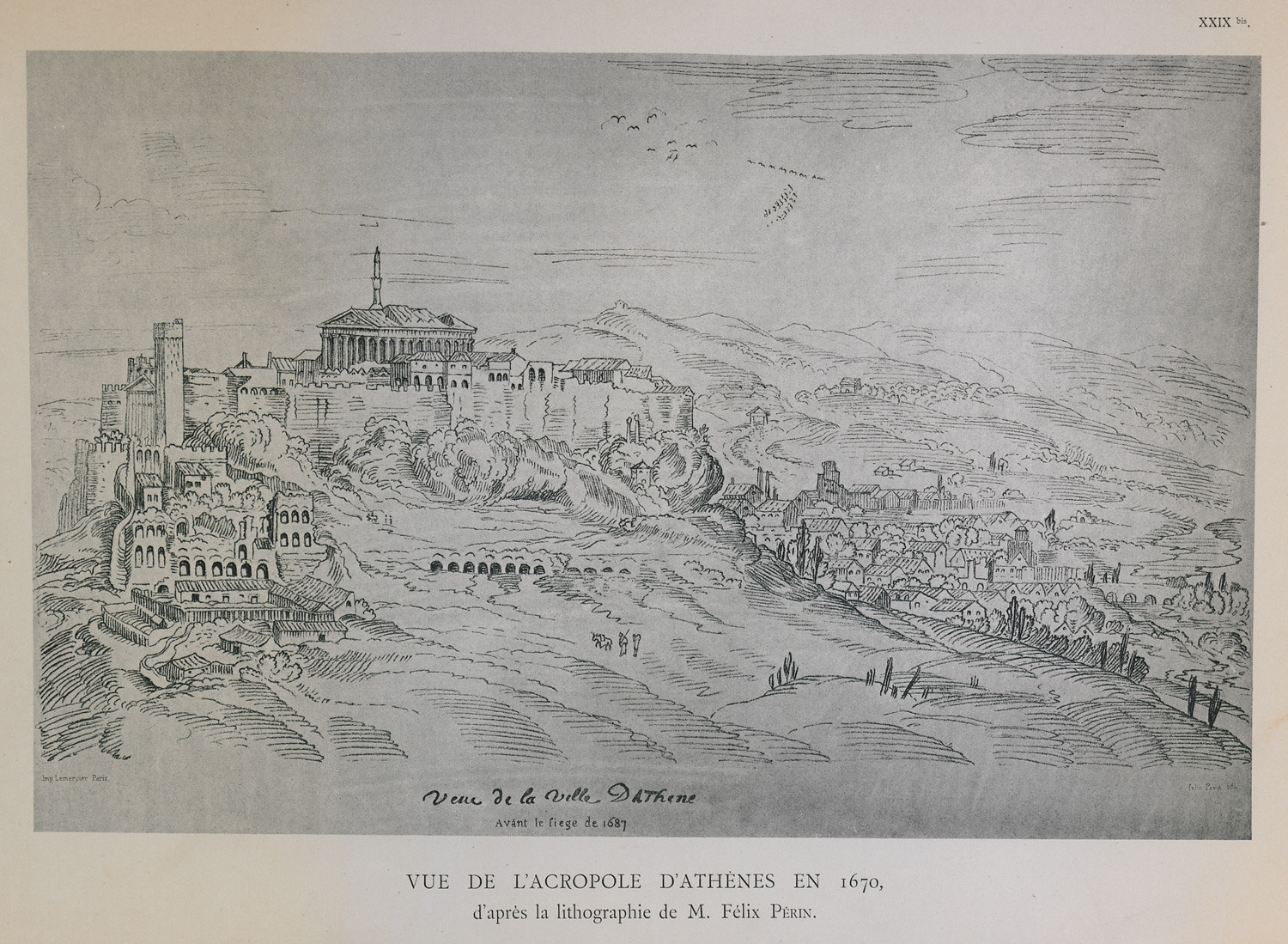
- View of the Acropolis in 1670, with the still intact Parthenon serving as a mosque

Religion
- Affiliation: Islam (former)
- Ecclesiastical or organizational status: Mosque: 1. 15th century–1687 2. 18th century–1843
- Status: 1. Destroyed (1687); 2. Dismantled (1843)

Location
- Location: Parthenon, Athenian Acropolis, Central Athens, Attica
- Country: Greece
- Interactive map of Parthenon mosque(s)

Architecture
- Style: Ottoman
- Completed: 1. 15th century 2. 18th century
- Demolished: 1. 1687; 2. 1843

The Parthenon mosque refers to one of two former mosques created successively within the Parthenon, on the Athenian Acropolis, in Central Athens. Erected during the Ottoman period, the first mosque was adapted from the Church of Our Lady of Athens, a church that was destroyed by a Venetian bombardment in 1687. The second mosque was a free-standing building erected in the open space of what was the naos of the now ruined Parthenon; that was dismantled in 1843.

== History ==
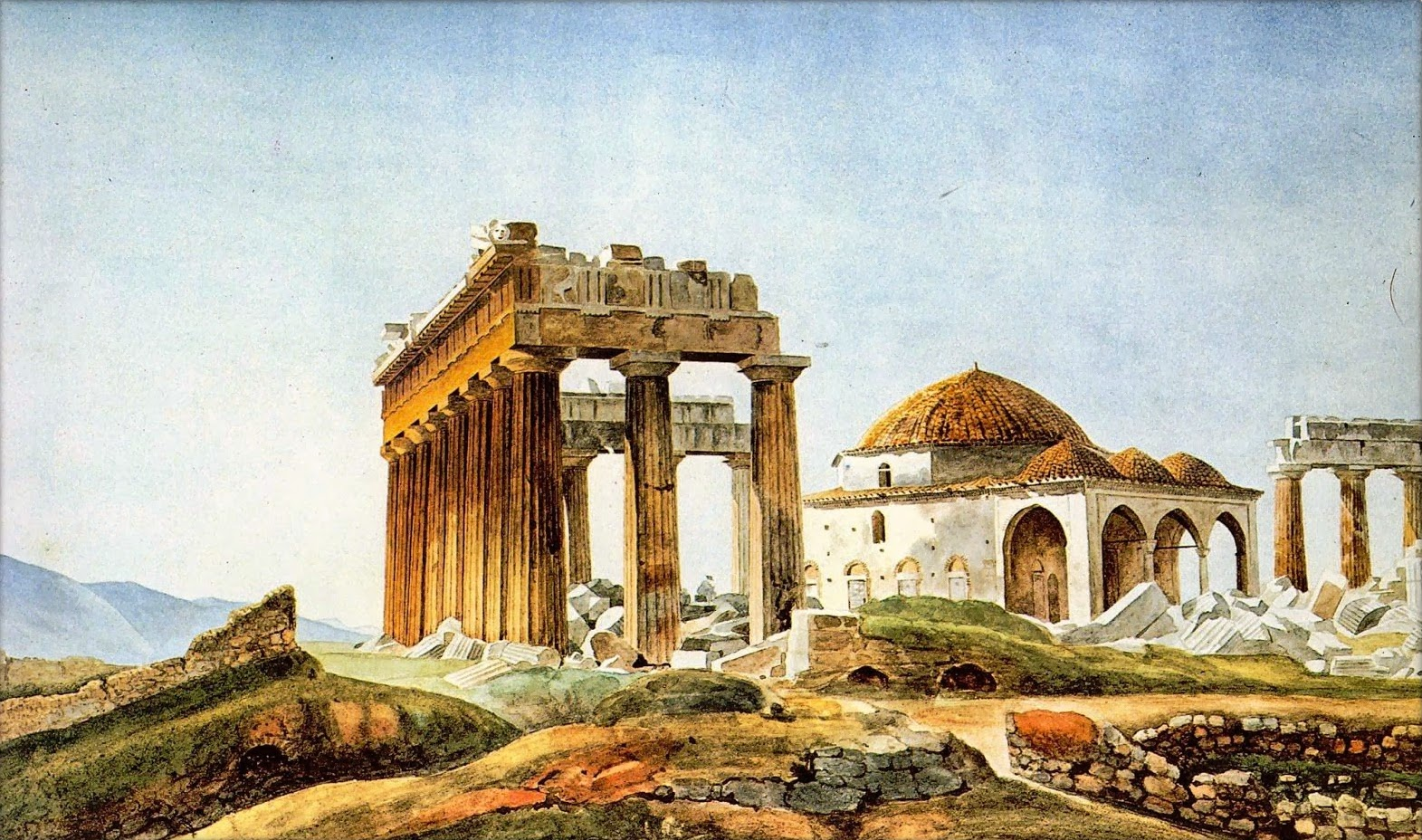
The second mosque in the ruined Parthenon, depicted by Pierre Peytier in the 1830s

=== First mosque ===
At what point the Parthenon first became a congregational mosque is undocumented. However, Mehmed II is known to have visited Athens in 1458 after the surrender of the Acropolis to the Ottoman Empire and again in 1460, and it is speculated that the act of conversion could have taken place then or shortly thereafter since the prominent churches of conquered territories were typically converted. The structural changes to the building were slight. A Frankish tower in the south-west corner of the pronaos, which might have served as a bell tower, was converted to a minaret. The presbytery screen, the high altar, and the altars in the side apses were all removed. The mosaic of the Virgin in the apse evidently survived conversion. Less certain is the fate of the ambo, the removal or not of the episcopal throne, and the precise location of the minbar and mihrab. This building was destroyed in the Venetian bombardment during the 1687 Siege of the Acropolis.

=== Second mosque ===
Following its destruction in 1687, the first mosque was replaced in the early 18th century with a smaller free-standing, single-domed mosque that stood in the cleared space of the naos. This in turn was removed in 1843 with the beginning of archaeological activity on the Acropolis.

== Evidence ==
The primary evidence for this period of the Parthenon’s existence is scant. Not only have the physical structures been erased, but the documentary evidence of the mosque is also scarce. The earliest references are in the biographies of Mehmed II and the Vienna Anonymous manuscript of c. 1460. Mehmed is recorded as having admired the city and its monuments. In 16th-century Ottoman tax records, the mosque is named cami’-i kal’e-i Atina, 'fortress mosque of Athens'. The most detailed surviving contemporary description is in Evliya Çelebi’s Seyahatnâme. Evliya not only recorded the physical details of the Parthenon but attempted to incorporate it into the Ottoman cultural milieu and Islamic legend and folklore. Evliya's visit in 1667 was succeeded by a number of European visitors, who left a small cache of records of the Ottoman Parthenon before its destruction. These include Carrey’s drawings, the Bassano drawing of 1670 and Spon’s, Vernon’s and Wheler’s accounts of the Acropolis. The second mosque is slightly better documented in the form of travellers' drawings. Amongst the last of these records is de Lotbinière's 1839 daguerreotype of the Parthenon, depicting the mosque still present in the naos.

== See also ==
- Islam in Greece
- List of former mosques in Greece
- Ottoman Athens

== Bibliography ==
- Fowden, Elizabeth Key (2018). "The Parthenon, Pericles and King Solomon: a case study of Ottoman archaeological imagination in Greece". Byzantine and Modern Greek Studies. 42 (2): 261–274. doi:10.1017/byz.2018.8. S2CID 165918625.
- Fowden, Elizabeth Key (2019). "The Parthenon Mosque, King Solomon and the Greek Sages". In Georgopoulou, M.; Thanasakis, K. (eds.). Ottoman Athens: Archaeology, Topography, History. Athens.
- Tournikiotis, Panayotis, ed. (2009). The Parthenon and Its Impact in Modern Times. Abrams.
- Ousterhout, Robert (2005). ""Bestride the Very Peak of Heaven": The Parthenon after Antiquity". In Neils, J. (ed.). The Parthenon: From Antiquity to the Present. Cambridge.
