= Francis Vernon =

English traveller and author

Francis Vernon (c. 1637 – 1677) was an English traveller and writer. Serving as secretary to the Paris embassy, Vernon became a key link between French and English scholars, copying important works for the Royal Society. He was considered frivolous, sharing court gossip and cultural news. His final journey from Venice to Safavid Persia ended in his murder in 1677 after rediscovering Delphi's location.

== Early life ==
Born about 1637, near Charing Cross, he was the son of Francis Vernon of London and brother of James Vernon. He was admitted in 1649 to Westminster School. He matriculated on 10 November 1654 at Christ Church, Oxford. He graduated B.A. on 28 January 1658, and M.A. on 17 July 1660.

Vernon began to travel before he had taken his master's degree. During one of his voyages, he was taken by pirates and sold. After his release, he seems to have returned to Oxford. In 1668, he was chosen because of his experience to accompany Charles Howard, 1st Earl of Carlisle, ambassador-extraordinary to Sweden, and the king wrote to Christ Church requesting a leave of absence for him.

== In Paris ==
Vernon was next appointed to go with Ralph Montagu to Paris as secretary to the embassy. His letters fell below the required standard, but he remained there till the end of 1671. He was, in fact, considered frivolous for filling correspondence with court and city gossip. He reported, for example, the first performances of plays by Jean Racine and Pierre Corneille in 1670 (the rival Bérénice and Tite et Bérénice).

During this time, Vernon became a point of contact between the scholars of France and England. In 1670, Christiaan Huygens, seriously ill, chose Vernon to carry out a donation of his papers to the Royal Society in London, should he die. Jean-Baptiste Colbert controlled the French Academy of Sciences closely; in particular, the circulation of publications of its academicians. Vernon copied the Mésure de la terre of Jean Picard for the Royal Society, which therefore saw it in 1671, while Colbert communicated it officially in 1676.

Among Vernon's other correspondents was Edward Pococke, copies of whose son's Latin version of Ibn-al-Tifail he presented to the Sorbonne and to Christiaan Huyghens. Another correspondent was John Collins, for whom Vernon obtained books through Jean Berthet, including works by René Descartes and Blaise Pascal. He also sent James Gregory a copy of Fermat's Diophantus. Vernon's services were recognised by his election to the Royal Society on his return to England in 1672, his proposer being Henry Oldenburg.

== Final voyage and death ==
Vernon's final journey was from Venice, through Dalmatia, Greece and the islands to Persia. This expedition led in particular to the rediscovery of the location of Delphi, which was, at that time, unknown in western Europe.

Vernon set off with George Wheler, Jacob Spon and Sir Giles Eastcourt on 20 June 1675. They were on the galley of the bailo (Giovanni Morosini, appointed that year). At Corfu, they were taken for spies, a recurring problem. The party broke up at Zante. All four, as well as Bernard Randolph, whom Vernon encountered later, left written records of these travels. An account of Athens, Athènes Ancienne et nouvelle, had appeared that year, written by George Guillet, who called himself Guillet de St Georges. It claimed to be based on first-hand experience but was in fact collated from published sources. Spon had seen a recent account by the Jesuit Jacques Babin and wanted to compare Guillet's book with the facts on the ground.

Vernon in fact anticipated Spon in checking Guillet's book. He landed in central Greece in August 1675, through Domvrena. He travelled to Athens, and set up to tour the Peloponnese on 2 September with Eastcourt as companion. Via Mistra and Kalamata, they turned north to Patras. At Naupaktos, Eastcourt fell ill, and he died at Vitrinitza. Via Salona, Delphi and Thebes, Vernon returned to Athens on 3 October.

Arriving alone in Persia, in the spring of 1677, Vernon was in a quarrel over a penknife and was murdered. He was buried at Ispahan two days afterwards. News of his fate was transmitted by Robert Huntington in Aleppo.

== Works ==
Vernon's Journal, which was begun at Spalatro (Split) and finished at Isfahan, was found among the papers of Robert Hooke. It contains notes and many inscriptions. A letter to Oldenburg, dated 10 January 1675, was printed in the Philosophical Transactions of 1676 as Observations made during Travels from Venice through Dalmatia … to Smyrna. It was translated into French by Jacob Spon, who incorporated it in his Réponses à la Critique publiée par M. Guillet, 1679. It contained the first description of Athens by an English visitor. In particular Vernon reported on the Parthenon, some years before the damage caused by Francesco Morosini's bombardment. Combined with notes of Jacques Carrey, the observations of Vernon were used by William Bell Dinsmoor in his Parthenon reconstruction, in relation to the south frieze.

A Latin poem entitled Oxonium Poema, published in 1667, under the initials "F. V. ex æde Christi", has been identified as by Vernon. It is a description of Oxford and its environs.
