= Scamilli impares =

Scamilli impares (unequal steps, Fr. escabeaux inegales; Ger. Schutzstege), in architecture, is a term quoted by Vitruvius when referring to the rise given to the stylobate in the centre of the front and sides of a Greek temple.

His explanation is not clear; he states (iii. 4) that, if set out level, the stylobate would have the appearance of being sunk in the centre, so that it is necessary that there should be an addition by means of small steps (scamilli impares). In book v. chap. 9, he again refers to the addition on the stylobate. The interpretation of his meaning by Penrose and other authorities is generally assumed to be the addition which it was necessary to leave on the lower frustum of the Doric column, or on the lower portion of the base of the Ionic column, so as to give them a proper bearing on the curved surface of the stylobate; when levelling ground, however, it is sometimes the custom to fix at intervals small bricks or tiles which are piled up until the upper surfaces of all of them are absolutely level.

If, as an alternative, these piles were so arranged as to rise towards the centre, instead of a level a slightly curved surface might be obtained, and the term unequal steps would apply to them. This was the opinion of M. Bernouf, a French author, who points out that scamilus is a diminutive of scamnum, a small step (Fr. petit banc), which in some parts of France is employed when levelling the surface of areas or courts. According to Penrose, the rise of the curved stylobate of the Parthenon had already been obtained in the stereobate carrying it, long before the problem of bedding the columns on the curve had arisen.
