= Ictinus =

Mid-5th-century BC Athenian architect

Ictinus (/ɪkˈtaɪnəs/; Greek: Ἰκτῖνος, Iktinos) was an architect active in the mid 5th century BC. Ancient sources identify Ictinus and Callicrates as co-architects of the Parthenon. He co-wrote a book on the project – which is now lost – in collaboration with Carpion.

Pausanias identifies Ictinus as architect of the Temple of Apollo at Bassae. That temple was Doric on the exterior, Ionic on the interior, and incorporated a Corinthian column, the earliest known, at the center rear of the cella. Sources also identify Ictinus as architect of the Telesterion at Eleusis, a gigantic hall used in the Eleusinian Mysteries.

Pericles also commissioned Ictinus to design the Telesterion ("Hall of Final Things") at Eleusis, but his involvement was terminated when Pericles fell from power. Three other architects took over instead. It seems likely that Ictinus's reputation was harmed by his links with the fallen ruler, as he is singled out for condemnation by Aristophanes in his play The Birds, dated to around 414 BC. It depicts the royal kite or ictinus – a play on the architect's name – not as a noble bird of prey but as a scavenger stealing sacrifices from the gods and money from men. As no other classical author describes the bird in this fashion, Aristophanes likely intended it to be a dig at the architect.

The artist Jean Auguste Dominique Ingres painted a scene showing Ictinus together with the lyric poet Pindar. The painting is known as Pindar and Ictinus and is exhibited at the National Gallery, London.

== Sources ==
- Plutarch, Pericles 13
