= Parthenon =

Temple on the Athenian Acropolis, Greece

- Παρθενώνας
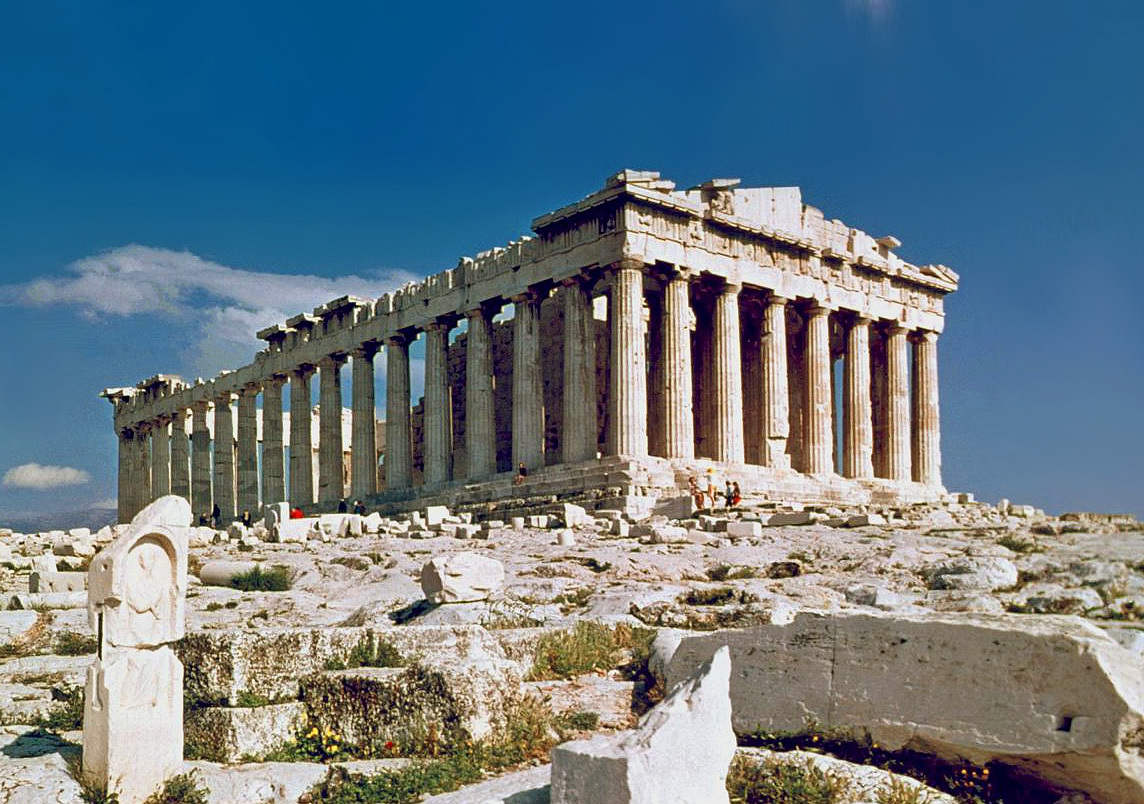
- The Parthenon in 1978

General information
- Type: Temple
- Architectural style: Classical
- Location: Athens, Greece
- Coordinates: 37.9715°N 23.7266°E
- Construction started: 447 BC
- Completed: 432 BC; 2458 years ago
- Destroyed: Partially in 1687

Height
- Height: 13.72 m (45.0 ft)

Dimensions
- Other dimensions: Cella: 29.8 by 19.2 m (98 by 63 ft)

Technical details
- Material: Pentelic Marble
- Size: 69.5 by 30.9 m (228 by 101 ft)
- Floor area: 73 by 34 m (240 by 112 ft)

Design and construction
- Architects: Iktinos, Callicrates
- Other designers: Phidias (sculptor)

The Parthenon (/ˈpɑːrθəˌnɒn, -nən/; Ancient Greek: Παρθενών, romanised: Parthenōn [par.tʰe.nɔ̌ːn]; Greek: Παρθενώνας, romanised: Parthenónas [parθeˈnonas]) is a former temple on the Athenian Acropolis, Greece, that was dedicated to the goddess Athena. Its decorative sculptures are considered some of the high points of classical Greek art, and the Parthenon is considered an enduring symbol of ancient Greece, Western civilisation, and democracy.

The Parthenon was built in the 5th century BC in thanksgiving for the Greek victory over the Persian invaders during the Greco-Persian Wars. Like most Greek temples, the Parthenon also served as the city treasury. Construction started in 447 BC when the Delian League was at the peak of its power. It was completed in 438 BC; work on the artwork and decorations continued until 432 BC. For a time, it served as the treasury of the Delian League, which later became the Athenian Empire.

In the final decade of the 6th century AD, the Parthenon was converted into a Christian church dedicated to the Virgin Mary. After the Ottoman conquest in the mid-15th century, it became a mosque. In the Morean War, a Venetian bomb landed on the Parthenon, which the Ottomans had used as a munitions dump, during the 1687 siege of the Acropolis. The resulting explosion severely damaged the Parthenon. From 1800 to 1803, the 7th Earl of Elgin controversially removed many of the surviving sculptures and subsequently shipped them to England where they are now known as the Elgin Marbles or Parthenon marbles. Since 1975, numerous large-scale restoration projects have been undertaken to preserve remaining artefacts and ensure its structural integrity.

== Etymology ==
The word "Parthenon" comes from the Greek parthénos (παρθένος) 'maiden, girl' as well as 'virgin, unmarried woman'. The Liddell–Scott–Jones Greek–English Lexicon states that it may have referred to the "unmarried women's apartments" in a house, but that in the Parthenon it seems to have been used for a particular room of the temple. There is some debate as to which room that was. The lexicon states that this room was the western cella of the Parthenon. This has also been suggested by J.B. Bury. One theory is that the Parthenon was the room where the arrephoroi, a group of four young girls chosen to serve Athena each year, wove a peplos that was presented to Athena during Panathenaic Festivals. Christopher Pelling asserts that the name "Parthenon" means the "temple of the virgin goddess", referring to the cult of Athena Parthenos that was associated with the temple. It has also been suggested that the name of the temple alludes to the maidens (parthénoi), whose supreme sacrifice guaranteed the safety of the city. In that case, the room originally known as the Parthenon could have been a part of the temple known today as the Erechtheion.

In 5th-century BC accounts of the building, the structure is simply called ὁ νᾱός (ho naos; lit. "the temple"). Douglas Frame writes that the name "Parthenon" was a nickname related to the statue of Athena Parthenos, and only appeared a century after construction. He contends that "Athena's temple was never officially called the Parthenon and she herself most likely never had the cult title parthénos". The ancient architects Iktinos and Callicrates appear to have called the building Ἑκατόμπεδος (Hekatómpedos; lit. "the hundred footer") in their lost treatise on Athenian architecture. Harpocration wrote that some people used to call the Parthenon the "Hekatompedos", not due to its size but because of its beauty and fine proportions. The first instance in which Parthenon definitely refers to the entire building comes from the fourth century BC orator Demosthenes. In the 4th century BC and later, the building was referred to as the Hekatompedos or the Hekatompedon as well as the Parthenon. Plutarch referred to the building during the first century AD as the Hekatompedos Parthenon.

A 2020 study by Janric van Rookhuijzen supports the idea that the building known today as the Parthenon was originally called the Hekatompedon. Based on literary and historical research, he proposes that "the treasury called the Parthenon should be recognized as the west part of the building now conventionally known as the Erechtheion".

Because the Parthenon was dedicated to the Greek goddess Athena, it was sometimes called the Temple of Minerva, the Roman name for Athena, particularly during the 19th century.

Parthénos was also applied to the Virgin Mary (Parthénos Maria) when the Parthenon was converted to a Christian church dedicated to the Virgin Mary in the final decade of the 6th century.

== Function ==
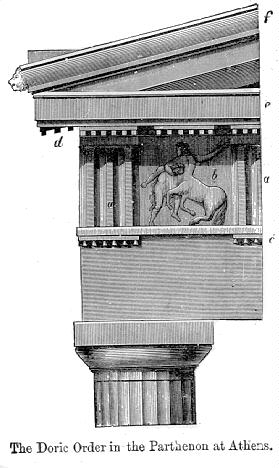
The Doric order of the Parthenon

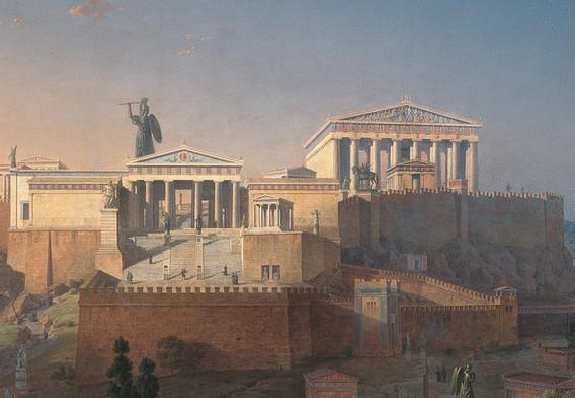
Reconstruction of the Parthenon, on the Acropolis of Athens, Greece

Although the Parthenon is architecturally a temple and is usually called so, some scholars have argued that it is not really a temple in the conventional sense of the word. A small shrine has been excavated within the building, on the site of an older sanctuary probably dedicated to Athena as a way to get closer to the goddess, but the Parthenon apparently never hosted the official cult of Athena Polias, patron of Athens. The cult image of Athena Polias, which was bathed in the sea and to which was presented the peplos, was an olive-wood xoanon, located in another temple on the northern side of the Acropolis, more closely associated with the Great Altar of Athena. The High Priestess of Athena Polias supervised the city cult of Athena based in the Acropolis, and was the chief of the lesser officials, such as the plyntrides, arrephoroi and kanephoroi.

The colossal statue of Athena by Phidias was not specifically related to any cult attested by ancient authors and is not known to have inspired any religious fervour. Preserved ancient sources do not associate it with any priestess, altar or cult name.

According to Thucydides, during the Peloponnesian War when Sparta's forces were first preparing to invade Attica, Pericles, in an address to the Athenian people, said that the statue could be used as a gold reserve if that was necessary to preserve Athens, stressing that it "contained forty talents of pure gold and it was all removable", but adding that the gold would afterward have to be restored. The Athenian statesman thus implies that the metal, obtained from contemporary coinage, could be used again if absolutely necessary without any impiety. According to Aristotle, the building also contained golden figures that he described as "Victories". The classicist Harris Rackham noted that eight of those figures were melted down for coinage during the Peloponnesian War. Other Greek writers have claimed that treasures such as Persian swords were also stored inside the temple. Some scholars, therefore, argue that the Parthenon should be viewed as a grand setting for a monumental votive statue rather than as a cult site.

Archaeologist Joan Breton Connelly has argued for the coherency of the Parthenon's sculptural programme in presenting a succession of genealogical narratives that track Athenian identity through the ages: from the birth of Athena, through cosmic and epic battles, to the final great event of the Athenian Bronze Age, the war of Erechtheus and Eumolpos. She argues a pedagogical function for the Parthenon's sculptured decoration, one that establishes and perpetuates Athenian foundation myth, memory, values and identity. While some classicists, including Mary Beard, Peter Green, and Garry Wills have doubted or rejected Connelly's thesis, an increasing number of historians, archaeologists, and classical scholars support her work. They include: J.J. Pollitt, Brunilde Ridgway, Nigel Spivey, Caroline Alexander, and A. E. Stallings.

=== Older Parthenon ===
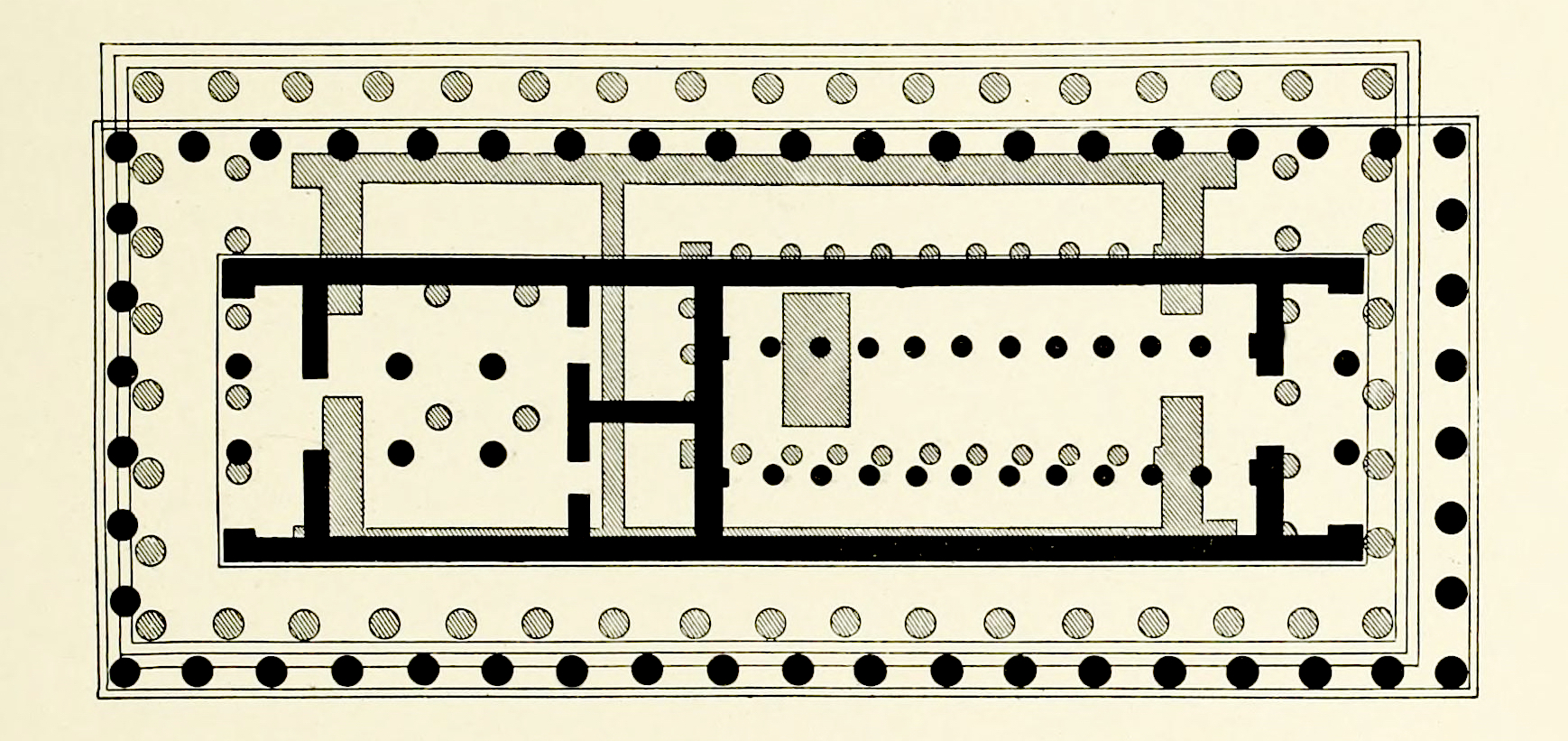
The Older Parthenon (in black) was destroyed by the Achaemenids during the Destruction of Athens in 480–479 BC, and then rebuilt by Pericles (in grey).

The first endeavour to build a sanctuary for Athena Parthenos on the site of the present Parthenon was begun shortly after the Battle of Marathon (c. 490–488 BC) upon a solid limestone foundation that extended and levelled the southern part of the Acropolis summit. This building replaced a Hekatompedon temple ("hundred-footer") and would have stood beside the archaic temple dedicated to Athena Polias ("of the city"). The Older or Pre-Parthenon, as it is frequently called, was still under construction when the Persians sacked the city in 480 BC and razed the Acropolis.

The existence of both the proto-Parthenon and its destruction were known from Herodotus, and the drums of its columns were visibly built into the curtain wall north of the Erechtheion. Further physical evidence of this structure was revealed with the excavations of Panagiotis Kavvadias of 1885–1890. The findings of this dig allowed Wilhelm Dörpfeld, then director of the German Archaeological Institute, to assert that there existed a distinct substructure to the original Parthenon, called Parthenon I by Dörpfeld, not immediately below the present edifice as previously assumed. Dörpfeld's observation was that the three steps of the first Parthenon consisted of two steps of Poros limestone, the same as the foundations, and a top step of Karrha limestone that was covered by the lowest step of the Periclean Parthenon. This platform was smaller and slightly to the north of the final Parthenon, indicating that it was built for a different building, now completely covered over. This picture was somewhat complicated by the publication of the final report on the 1885–1890 excavations, indicating that the substructure was contemporary with the Kimonian walls, and implying a later date for the first temple.

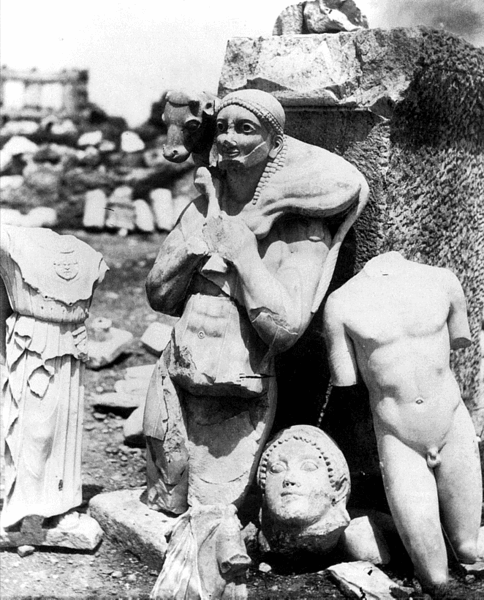
Part of the archaeological remains called Perserschutt, or "Persian rubble": remnants of the destruction of Athens by the armies of Xerxes I. Photographed in 1866, just after excavation.

If the original Parthenon was indeed destroyed in 480, it invites the question of why the site was left as a ruin for thirty-three years. One argument involves the oath sworn by the Greek allies before the Battle of Plataea in 479 BC declaring that the sanctuaries destroyed by the Persians would not be rebuilt, an oath from which the Athenians were only absolved with the Peace of Callias in 450. The cost of reconstructing Athens after the Persian sack is at least as likely a cause. The excavations of Bert Hodge Hill led him to propose the existence of a second Parthenon, begun in the period of Kimon after 468. Hill claimed that the Karrha limestone step Dörpfeld thought was the highest of Parthenon I was the lowest of the three steps of Parthenon II, whose stylobate dimensions Hill calculated at 23.51 by 66.888 metres (77.13 ft × 219.45 ft).

One difficulty in dating the proto-Parthenon is that at the time of the 1885 excavation, the archaeological method of seriation was not fully developed; the careless digging and refilling of the site led to a loss of much valuable information. An attempt to make sense of the potsherds found on the Acropolis came with the two-volume study by Graef and Langlotz published in 1925–1933. This inspired American archaeologist William Bell Dinsmoor to give limiting dates for the temple platform and the five walls hidden under the re-terracing of the Acropolis. Dinsmoor concluded that the latest possible date for Parthenon I was no earlier than 495 BC, contradicting the early date given by Dörpfeld. He denied that there were two proto-Parthenons, and held that the only pre-Periclean temple was what Dörpfeld referred to as Parthenon II. Dinsmoor and Dörpfeld exchanged views in the American Journal of Archaeology in 1935.

=== Present building ===
Animation showing the Parthenon in 2011 and a reconstruction of its original appearance

In the mid-5th century BC, when the Athenian Acropolis became the seat of the Delian League, Pericles initiated the building project that lasted the entire second half of the century. The most important buildings visible on the Acropolis today – the Parthenon, the Propylaia, the Erechtheion and the Temple of Athena Nike – were erected during this period. The Parthenon was built under the general supervision of Phidias, who also had charge of the sculptural decoration. The architects Ictinos and Callicrates began their work in 447, and the building was substantially completed by 432. Work on the decorations continued until at least 431.

The Parthenon was built primarily by men who knew how to work marble. These quarrymen had exceptional skills and were able to cut the blocks of marble to very specific measurements. The quarrymen also knew how to avoid the faults, which were numerous in the Pentelic marble. If the marble blocks were not up to standard, the architects would reject them. The marble was worked with iron tools – picks, points, punches, chisels, and drills. The quarrymen would hold their tools against the marble block and firmly tap the surface of the rock.

A big project like the Parthenon attracted stonemasons from far and wide who travelled to Athens to assist in the project. Slaves and foreigners worked together with the Athenian citizens in the building of the Parthenon, doing the same jobs for the same pay. Temple building was a specialised craft, and there were not many men in Greece qualified to build temples like the Parthenon, so these men would travel and work where they were needed.

Other craftsmen were necessary for the building of the Parthenon, specifically carpenters and metalworkers. Unskilled labourers also had key roles in the building of the Parthenon. They loaded and unloaded the marble blocks and moved the blocks from place to place. In order to complete a project like the Parthenon, many different labourers were needed.

== Architecture ==
=== Size and exterior ===
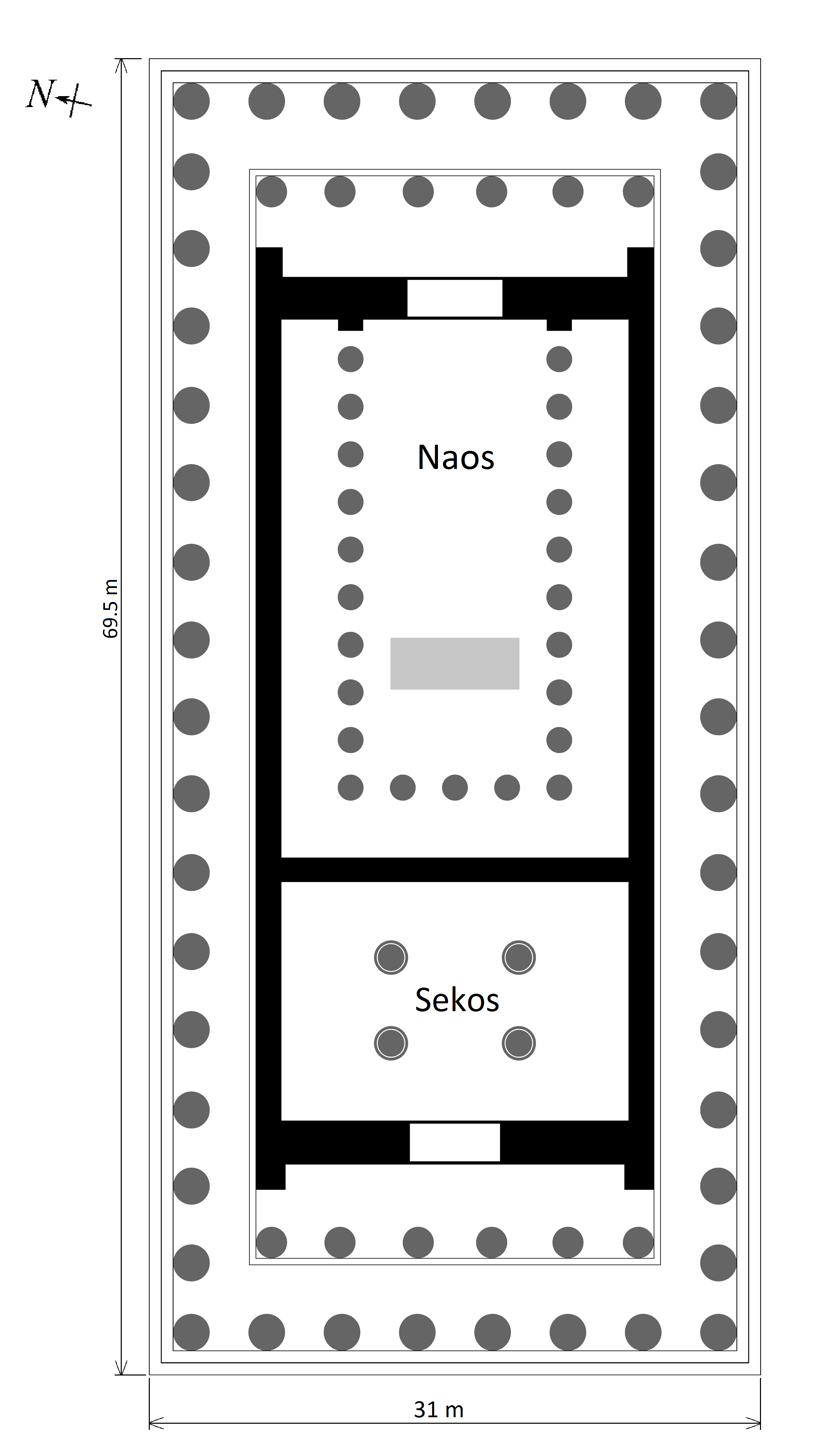
Floor plan of the Parthenon

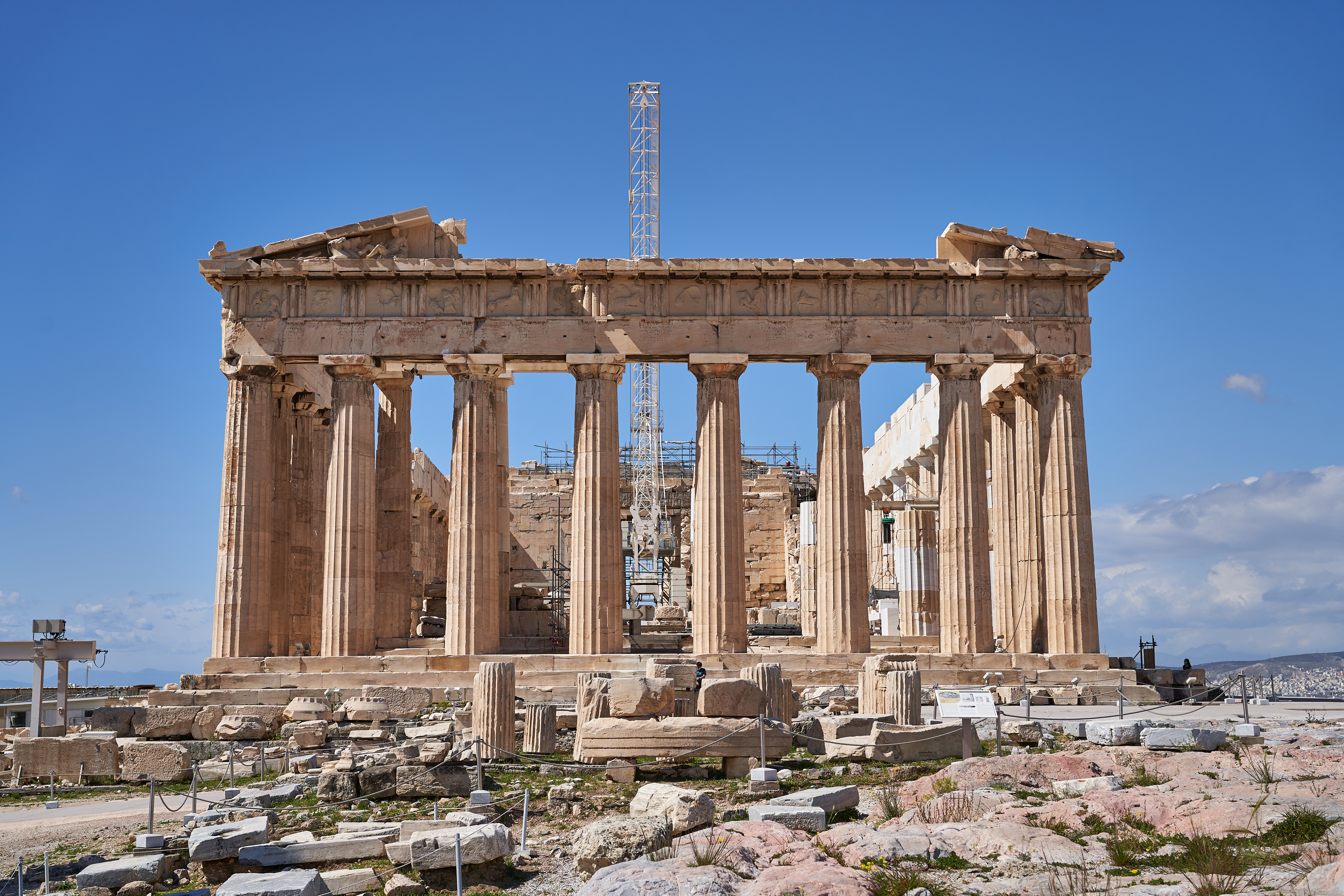
The east facade in March 2021

The Parthenon is an octastyle peripteral Doric temple with an Ionic hexastyle amphiprostyle two-chambered cella. It was built on the euthynteria and krepis of its precursor building, the Older Parthenon. In common with other Greek temples, the Parthenon is built using the post and lintel construction, surrounded by columns ('peripteral') carrying an entablature. The gable-end of the Parthenon features eight columns instead of the traditional six found in typical Doric temples. Although octastyle temples were not entirely unknown, their presence in mainland Doric architecture, along with the wider inner masonry structure, the cella, makes the Parthenon unique in its design. (Note: While the octastyle plan is characteristic of Cycladic architecture, it was rare in mainland Doric temples. The few other known Doric octastyle temples (Corfu, Cyrene and Selinunte) are located on islands or in colonies. This combination of features is known as the Attic-Doric style. The marble ceiling is also a Cycladic feature.) There are seventeen columns on the sides. A ratio of 4:9 proportion is found in the elevation and the relationship of the columns to their spacing (the interaxial). There is a double row of columns at both the front and rear. The cella is divided into two compartments. The opisthodomos (the back room of the cella) contained the monetary contributions of the Delian League. The hexastyle pronaos replaced the typical distyle in antis porch to the naos. At either end of the building, the gable is finished with a triangular pediment originally occupied by sculpted figures.

The choice to design the Parthenon as an octostyle temple likely stemmed from the challenge of scale: creating a larger naos required a proportionally larger overall structure. Maintaining the traditional hexastyle layout would have necessitated wider spacing between columns, which could have compromised structural stability. Moreover, expanding the temple while adhering to the established Doric proportions would have disrupted their harmony. Consequently, the architects made a series of design decisions that ultimately broke with mainland Doric conventions to achieve both the desired size and aesthetic integrity.

=== Interior ===
The Parthenon's interior displays several unusual and innovative features. The northern peristyle contained an archaic naiskos and altar, preserved to maintain religious continuity on the site. The Parthenon's porticos are unusually shallow, and the naos includes a second step. The rear room (opisthodomos) was wider, a Cycladic trait, and held four columns, likely Ionic or Corinthian. Large doors connected the rooms, and the only pronaos had tall windows (about 3 m high and 2.5 m wide), a rare feature in Greek architecture. The north window also served as a landing for a staircase within the thick wall leading to the attic. Other irregularities include varying abacus lengths, deliberate interaxial differences of up to 4.8 cm, and uneven architrave blocks are misaligned and differ by as much as 18 cm. Scholars interpret these changes variously—as adjustments for corner contraction (Dinsmoor), evidence of a mid-construction design change (Wesenberg), or signs of improvisation when an Ionic frieze replaced an intended Doric one (Korres).

=== Optical refinements ===
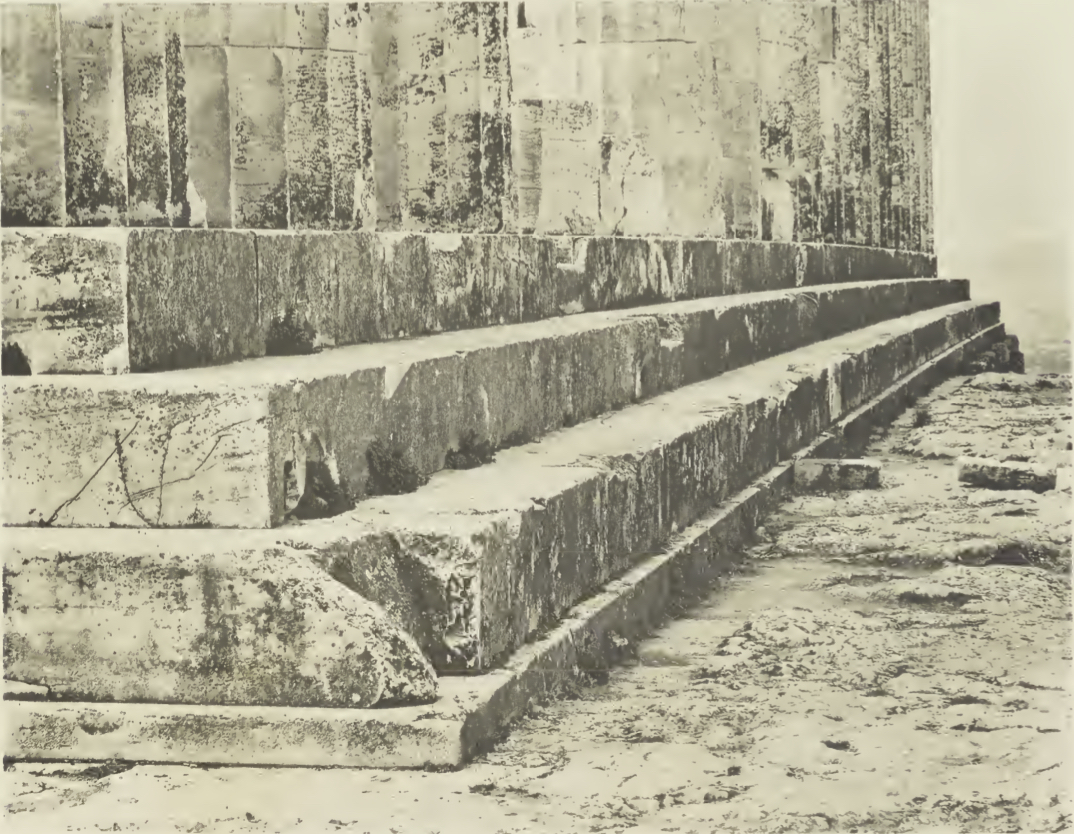
Curvature of the stylobate of the Parthenon

The close measurement of the Parthenon in the nineteenth century revealed that the temple deviated from strict rectilinearity through several optical refinements. (Note: First published in Hoffer, Allgemeine Bauzeitung (1838), perhaps also an observation made independently by Pennethorne and published in The Elements and Mathematical Principles of the Greek Architects and Artists (London 1844). See Goodyear, 1912, pp.3-5 for discussion.) First, the stylobate is curved, bulging upward at the centre—by 10.3 cm over 70 m (a 1/700 ratio)—with a corresponding curvature in the entablature, visible as a slight ridge on the capitals. Second, the columns exhibit entasis, i.e., swelling that reduces toward the top, a practice in use by mid-6th century but in Parthenon the effect is subtler with a ratio of 1/550 to 1/600. Third, both the columns and naos walls incline slightly inward. Fourth, the corner columns are slightly displaced.

Scholars have proposed several explanations for the curvatures found in Parthenon. (Note: Curvature has been observed in a few other Greek temples, e.g., the Temple of Apollo at Corinth from the mid-sixth century BC, and the Library of Celsus at Ephesus, 2nd century AD.) The primary explanation is based on the Optical Correction or Irradiance Theory, proposed in An Investigation of the Principles of Athenian Architecture by Francis Penrose in 1851. The theory asserts that convex adjustments were made to counteract the concave appearance silhouetted objects can have to the human eye. Others attribute the refinements to structural, such as drainage, or aesthetic considerations rather than perceptual ones. In 1878, John Pennethorne's The Geometry and Optics of Ancient Architecture argued that curvilinear nature of the Parthenon was a deliberate design choice, supporting Penrose's conclusions and corresponding with Vitruvius' account of the Scamilli impares. Karl Bötticher believed the deviations resulted from structural settlement, while William Henry Goodyear viewed them as symbolic and aesthetic.

Another refinement relates to the Doric order's angle, that is the challenge of spacing columns, metopes, and triglyphs so the frieze ends correctly at the corners, known as contraction problem. At the Parthenon, the architects to resolve this problem varied the length of the metopes, between 1.175 and 1.37 m, and 'overcontracting' the corner incolumnations.

The mathematician Alain Goriely in a paper titled "The illusion of illusions: there are no optical corrections in the Parthenon" has argued the claim of optical refinements is "one of the oldest and most enduring myths in human history", noting that they are "either unsupported by evidence or too small to have a perceptible effect under typical viewing conditions".

=== Unit of measurement ===
There was no standardised unit of measurement in ancient Greek metrology, as each region—or even individual building site—often employed its own foot (πούς). Scholars have proposed several possible units for the Parthenon: the Attic (or Ionic) foot at 294.3 mm, the Common foot at 306.5 mm, and the Doric foot at 327 mm. (Note: Each has had its advocate, Dörpfeld and Dinsmoor of the Doric, for example. See H. Bankel, Das Fußmaß des Parthenon, 1984.) However, applying any of these to the temple's architectural dimensions, such as the stylobate's length and width or the column height, fails to yield consistent integer values. Attempts to link the design instead to Vitruvius's modular system, based on half the lower column diameter (the width of a triglyph), have been similarly inconclusive. In the Parthenon, the triglyph measures about 858.3 mm, though actual widths vary from roughly 0.84 m to 0.87 m.

More recent research by Ernst Berger identifies 858 mm as a recurring unit underlying the building's main dimensions. Dividing this by 2.5 produces a 'Parthenon foot' of 343.04 mm, as proposed by Anne Bulckens. This measure preserves the Parthenon's characteristic 9:4 proportion while also revealing additional ratios that Bulckens suggests may relate to the pentatonic scale.

=== Proportion ===
No ancient Greek text on architecture has survived to the present day. (Note: Iktinos and Karpion wrote a book on the Parthenon, Vitruvius 7.pref.12, that has not survived.) The methods and working practices of Greek architects are unknown to us, so attempts to reconstruct the system of proportion used on the Parthenon as a means of uncovering the motivations of its architects have gone hand-in-hand with a desire to explain its purported ‘perfection’. These systems fall into two broad categories: arithmetic or geometric ratios and systems of modularity.

Perhaps one of the most common beliefs about the system of proportion used on the Parthenon is that of the Golden Ratio Theory. (Note: Markowsky cites five sources, and it is a claim commonly made in reference works.) That the Golden Section, or phi, the ratio of the sum of two values and their larger value, determined the construction of the temple was first articulated by Adolf Zeising in his Neue Lehre von den Proportionen des menschlichen Körpers (1854). Zeising made specific reference to the plan of the Parthenon when he and subsequent scholars made expansive claims that phi was ubiquitous in nature and art and fundamental to human perception of beauty. More recent research has questioned whether ancient architects either had knowledge of phi or made use of it, has pointed out that application of the ratio to the Parthenon was somewhat arbitrary in its construction, and that the basis of the claim was often a geometric figure superimposed on a photograph rather than from measured drawings.

While Zeising’s hypothesis remains unsubstantiated, an alternative observation that the ratio of the length and width of several features of the Parthenon gives simple, commensurable whole number ratios, namely 9:4, has garnered some support. First published in 1863 by William Watkiss-Lloyd, this relationship was detected on the stylobate, the diameter of column to intercolumniation, and the height of the facade including the cornice to the width. That this ratio falls out into integer values, avoids irrationals and is seen on other Greek buildings has led to the popular temptation to see this method of proportioning as the one that motivated the original architects. Lloyd’s approach has, like other numerical ratio-based approaches, been criticised for its arbitrariness, its susceptibility to selective measurement confirmation bias, and the absence of explicit ancient sources validating it. (Note: Lloyd's study was republished in the second edition of Penrose's An Investigation of the Principles of Athenian Architecture, 1888, where Penrose asserted it "completely solved the problem” of the Parthenon's proportions. However, Jay Hambidge's close measurement refuted the claim, "It has long been assumed that the relation of the end to side top step of the temple was four to nine, that is one to two and a quarter. This is not true. The amount of error is too great. The real relationship is 1 to 2.25109, and the real rectangle measures 101.347 by 228.141.")

One attempt to describe the Parthenon as a geometric system aligned with Greek mathematical thought was Jay Hambidge’s Dynamic Symmetry theory. Published in the early 20th century it sought to explain harmonious proportions through so-called “root rectangles” and their relationships, inspired by patterns found in nature such as phyllotaxis. Starting from root rectangles whose sides are irrational values, he goes on to construct reciprocal rectangles often in the form of the golden spiral. These recursively generated rectangles, Hambidge claimed, generated a dynamic growth which could be mapped onto the Parthenon, and this demonstrated that Greek design was inherently dynamic and natural rather than static. The theory was influential outside academia on figures such as George Bellows and Le Corbusier (Note: Matila Ghyka was an advocate of Hambidge and a known influence on Le Corbusier's modular.), and was responsible for a revival of interest in the Golden Section; it was nevertheless also criticised for its arbitrariness and lack of historical evidence.

Most recent research has endeavoured to incorporate the idea that the Parthenon’s design reflects Pythagorean musical ratios, such as 3:2 (the perfect fifth) and 4:9. According to this interpretation, the Parthenon’s dimensions (length, width, and height) relate as musical intervals, embedding mathematical harmony into architecture. Anne Bulckens begins with the discovery of a ‘theoretical triglyph’ width of 857.6 mm, which is the basis for a modular system from which smaller units, “dactyls”, can be derived, and on which basis she observes the presence of 3-4-5 right triangles in the structure. Drawing on the work of Kappraff and McClain, Bucklens shows that all key measurements relate to the musical scale of Pythagoras. (Note: Lehman and Weiman's The Parthenon and Liberal Education, also develops the thesis that the Parthenon embodies principles of Pythagorean musical theories.)

== Sculpture ==
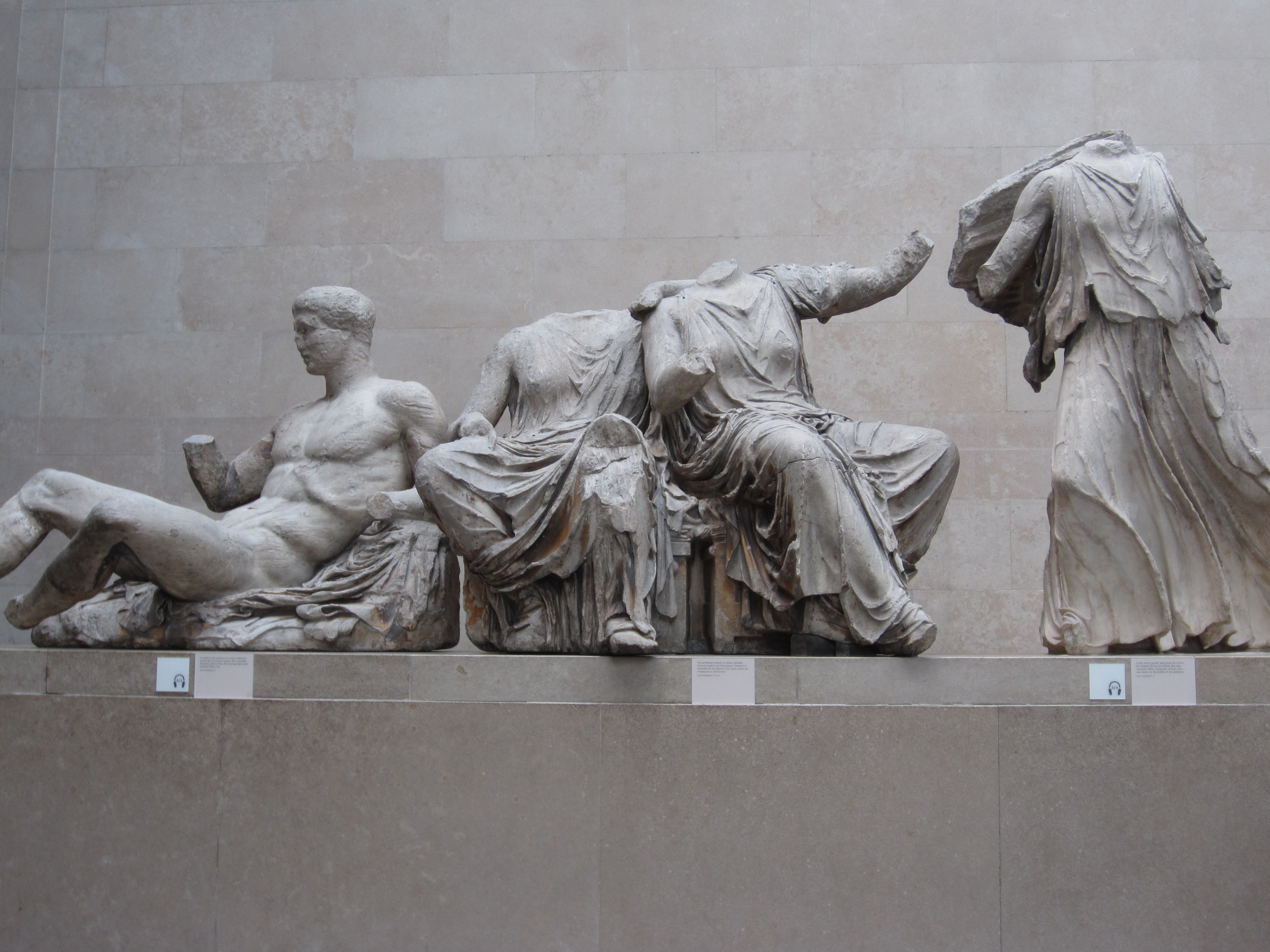
Group from the east pediment, British Museum

The cella of the Parthenon housed the chryselephantine statue of Athena Parthenos sculpted by Phidias and dedicated in 439 or 438 BC. The appearance of this is known from other images. The decorative stonework was originally coloured. The temple was dedicated to Athena at that time, though construction continued until almost the beginning of the Peloponnesian War in 432. By the year 438, the Doric metopes on the frieze above the exterior colonnade and the Ionic frieze around the upper portion of the walls of the cella had been completed.

Only a small number of the original sculptures remain in situ. Most of the surviving sculptures are at the Acropolis Museum in Athens and at the British Museum in London (see Elgin Marbles). Additional pieces are at the Louvre, the National Museum of Denmark, and the Kunsthistoriches Museum in Vienna.

In March 2022, the Acropolis Museum launched a new website with "photographs of all the frieze blocks preserved today in the Acropolis Museum, the British Museum and the Louvre".

=== Metopes ===
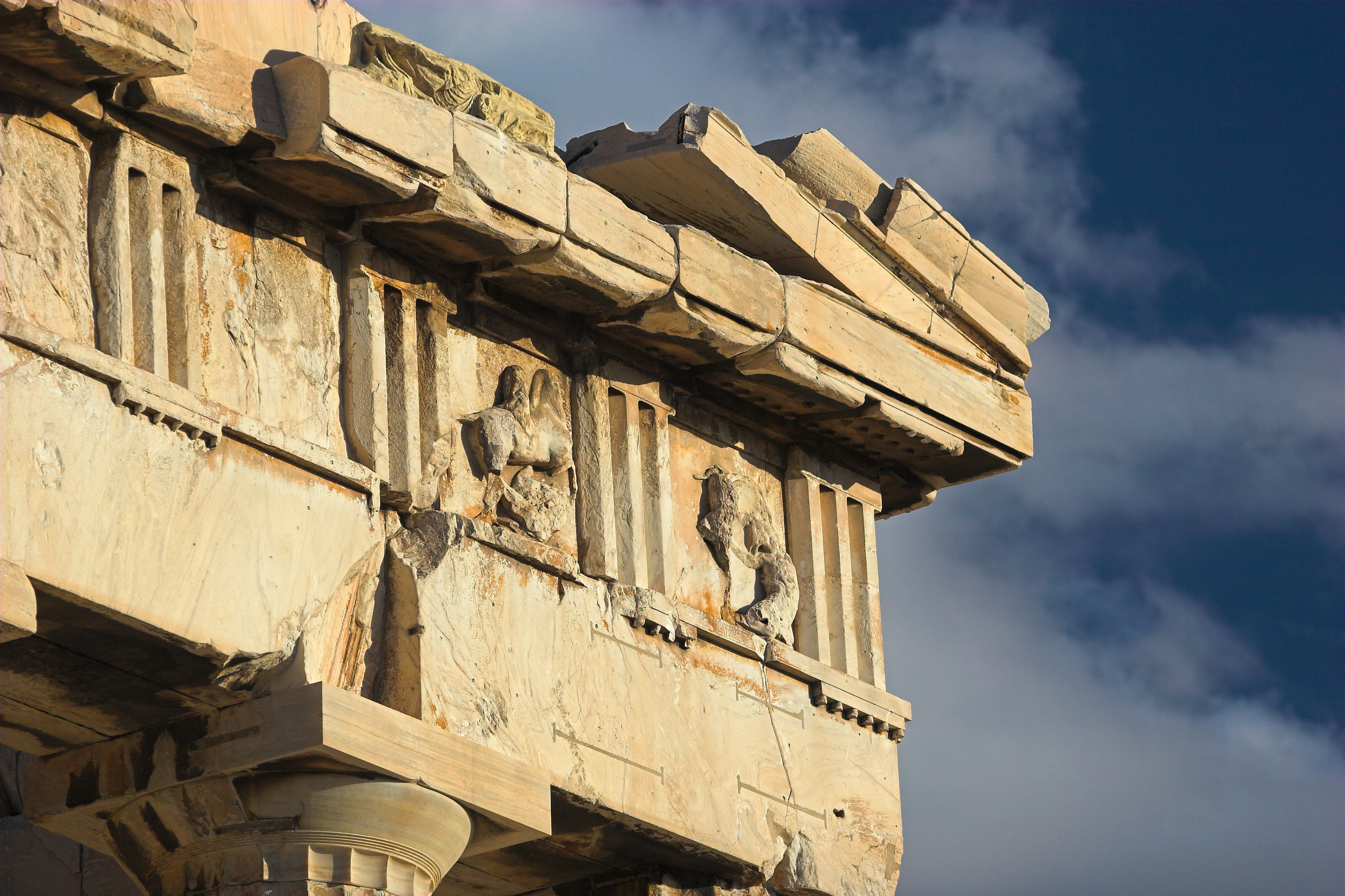
Detail of the West metopes

The frieze of the Parthenon's entablature contained 92 metopes, 14 each on the east and west sides, 32 each on the north and south sides. They were carved in high relief, a practice employed until then only in treasuries (buildings used to keep votive gifts to the gods). According to the building records, the metope sculptures date to the years 446–440. The metopes of the east side of the Parthenon, above the main entrance, depict the Gigantomachy (the mythical battle between the Olympian gods and the Giants). The metopes of the west end show the Amazonomachy (the mythical battle of the Athenians against the Amazons). The metopes of the south side show the Thessalian Centauromachy (battle of the Lapiths aided by Theseus against the half-man, half-horse Centaurs). Metopes 13–21 are missing, but drawings from 1674 attributed to Jaques Carrey indicate a series of humans; these have been variously interpreted as scenes from the Lapith wedding, scenes from the early history of Athens, and various myths. On the north side of the Parthenon, the metopes are poorly preserved, but the subject seems to be the sack of Troy.

The mythological figures of the metopes of the East, North, and West sides of the Parthenon had been deliberately mutilated by Christian iconoclasts in late antiquity.

The metopes present examples of the Severe Style in the anatomy of the figures' heads, in the limitation of the corporal movements to the contours and not to the muscles, and in the presence of pronounced veins in the figures of the Centauromachy. Several of the metopes still remain on the building, but, with the exception of those on the northern side, they are severely damaged. Some of them are located at the Acropolis Museum, others are in the British Museum, and one is at the Louvre museum.

In March 2011, archaeologists announced that they had discovered five metopes of the Parthenon in the south wall of the Acropolis, which had been extended when the Acropolis was used as a fortress. According to Eleftherotypia daily, the archaeologists claimed the metopes had been placed there in the 18th century when the Acropolis wall was being repaired. The experts discovered the metopes while processing 2,250 photos with modern photographic methods, as the white Pentelic marble they are made of differed from the other stone of the wall. It was previously presumed that the missing metopes were destroyed during the Morosini explosion of the Parthenon in 1687.

=== Frieze ===
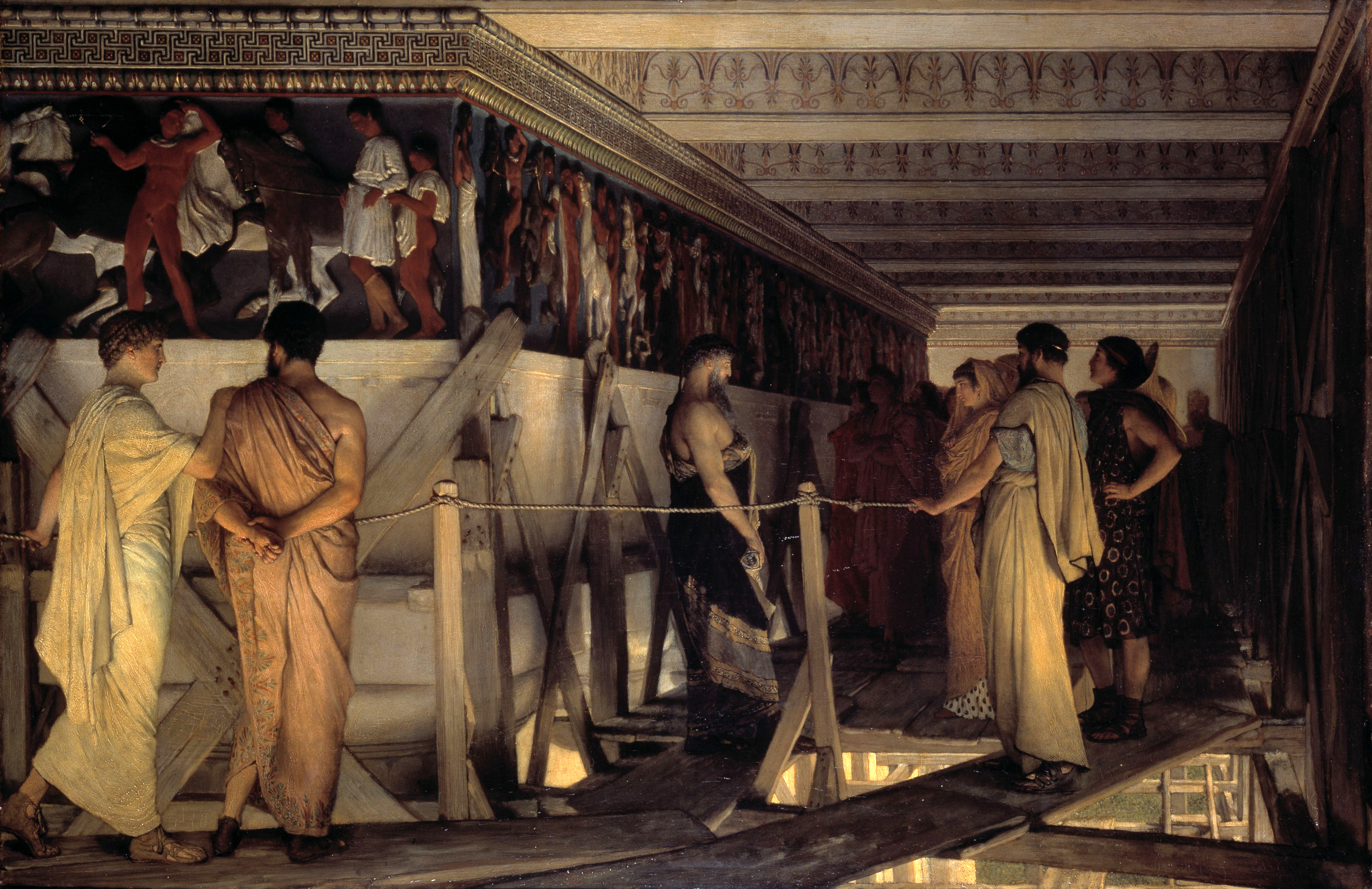
Phidias Showing the Frieze of the Parthenon to his Friends, 1868 painting by Lawrence Alma-Tadema

The most characteristic feature in the architecture and decoration of the temple is the Ionic frieze running around the exterior of the cella walls. The bas-relief frieze was carved in situ and is dated from c. 443–438.

One interpretation is that it depicts an idealised version of the Panathenaic procession from the Dipylon Gate in the Kerameikos to the Acropolis. In this procession held every year, with a special procession taking place every four years, Athenians and foreigners participated in honouring the goddess Athena by offering her sacrifices and a new peplos dress, woven by selected noble Athenian girls called ergastines. The procession is more crowded (appearing to slow in pace) as it nears the gods on the eastern side of the temple.

Joan Breton Connelly offers a mythological interpretation for the frieze, one that is in harmony with the rest of the temple's sculptural programme which shows Athenian genealogy through a series of succession myths set in the remote past. She identifies the central panel above the door of the Parthenon as the pre-battle sacrifice of the daughter of the king Erechtheus, a sacrifice that ensured Athenian victory over Eumolpos and his Thracian army. The great procession marching toward the east end of the Parthenon shows the post-battle thanksgiving sacrifice of cattle and sheep, honey and water, followed by the triumphant army of Erechtheus returning from their victory. This represents the first Panathenaia set in mythical times, the model on which historic Panathenaic processions were based. This interpretation has been rejected by William St Clair, who considers that the frieze shows the celebration of the birth of Ion, who was a descendant of Erechtheus. This interpretation has been rejected by Catharine Titi, who agrees with St Clair that the mood is one of celebration (rather than sacrifice) but argues that the celebration of the birth of Ion requires the presence of an infant but there is no infant on the frieze.

=== Pediments ===
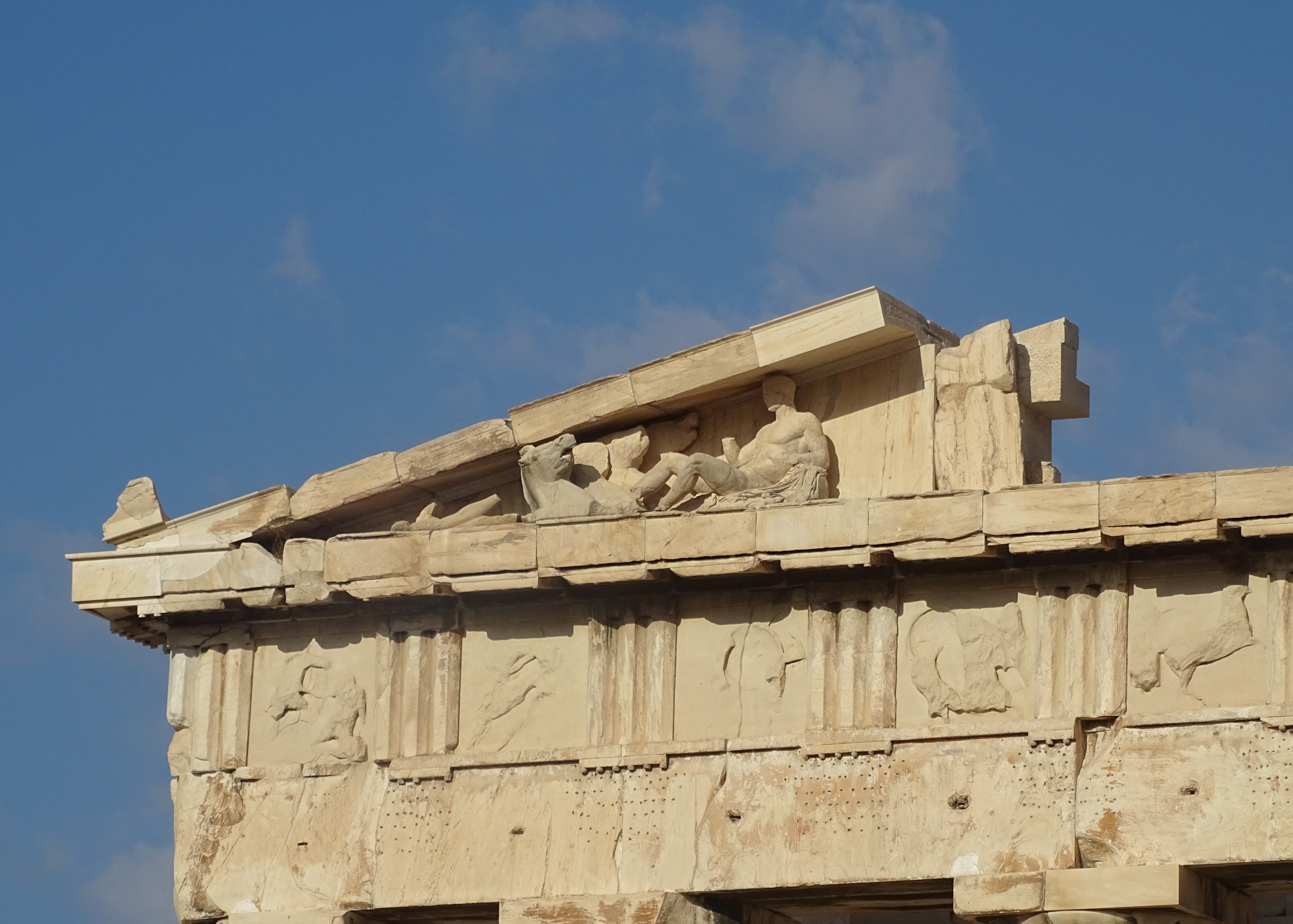
Part of the east pediment still found on the Parthenon (although part of it, like Dionysus, is a copy)

Two pediments rise above the portals of the Parthenon, one on the east front, one on the west. The triangular sections once contained massive sculptures that, according to the second-century geographer Pausanias, recounted the birth of Athena and the mythological battle between Athena and Poseidon for control of Athens.

==== East pediment ====
The east pediment originally contained 10 to 12 sculptures depicting the Birth of Athena. Most of those pieces were removed and lost during renovations in either the eighth or the twelfth century. Only two corners remain today with figures depicting the passage of time over the course of a full day. Tethrippa of Helios is in the left corner and Selene is on the right. The horses of Helios's chariot are shown with livid expressions as they ascend into the sky at the start of the day. Selene's horses struggle to stay on the pediment scene as the day comes to an end.

==== West pediment ====
The supporters of Athena are extensively illustrated at the back of the left chariot, while the defenders of Poseidon are shown trailing behind the right chariot. It is believed that the corners of the pediment are filled by Athenian water deities, such as the Kephisos river, the Ilissos river, and nymph Kallirhoe. This belief emerges from the fluid character of the sculptures' body position which represents the effort of the artist to give the impression of a flowing river. Next to the left river god, there are the sculptures of the mythical king of Athens (Cecrops or Kekrops) with his daughters (Aglaurus, Pandrosos, Herse). The statue of Poseidon was the largest sculpture in the pediment until it broke into pieces during Francesco Morosini's effort to remove it in 1688. The posterior piece of the torso was found by Lusieri in the groundwork of a Turkish house in 1801 and is currently held in the British Museum. The anterior portion was revealed by Ross in 1835 and is now held in the Acropolis Museum of Athens.

Every statue on the west pediment has a fully completed back, which would have been impossible to see when the sculpture was on the temple; this indicates that the sculptors put great effort into accurately portraying the human body.

=== Athena Parthenos ===
The only piece of sculpture from the Parthenon known to be from the hand of Phidias was the statue of Athena housed in the naos. This massive chryselephantine sculpture is now lost and known only from copies, vase painting, gems, literary descriptions, and coins.

== Later history ==
=== Late antiquity ===
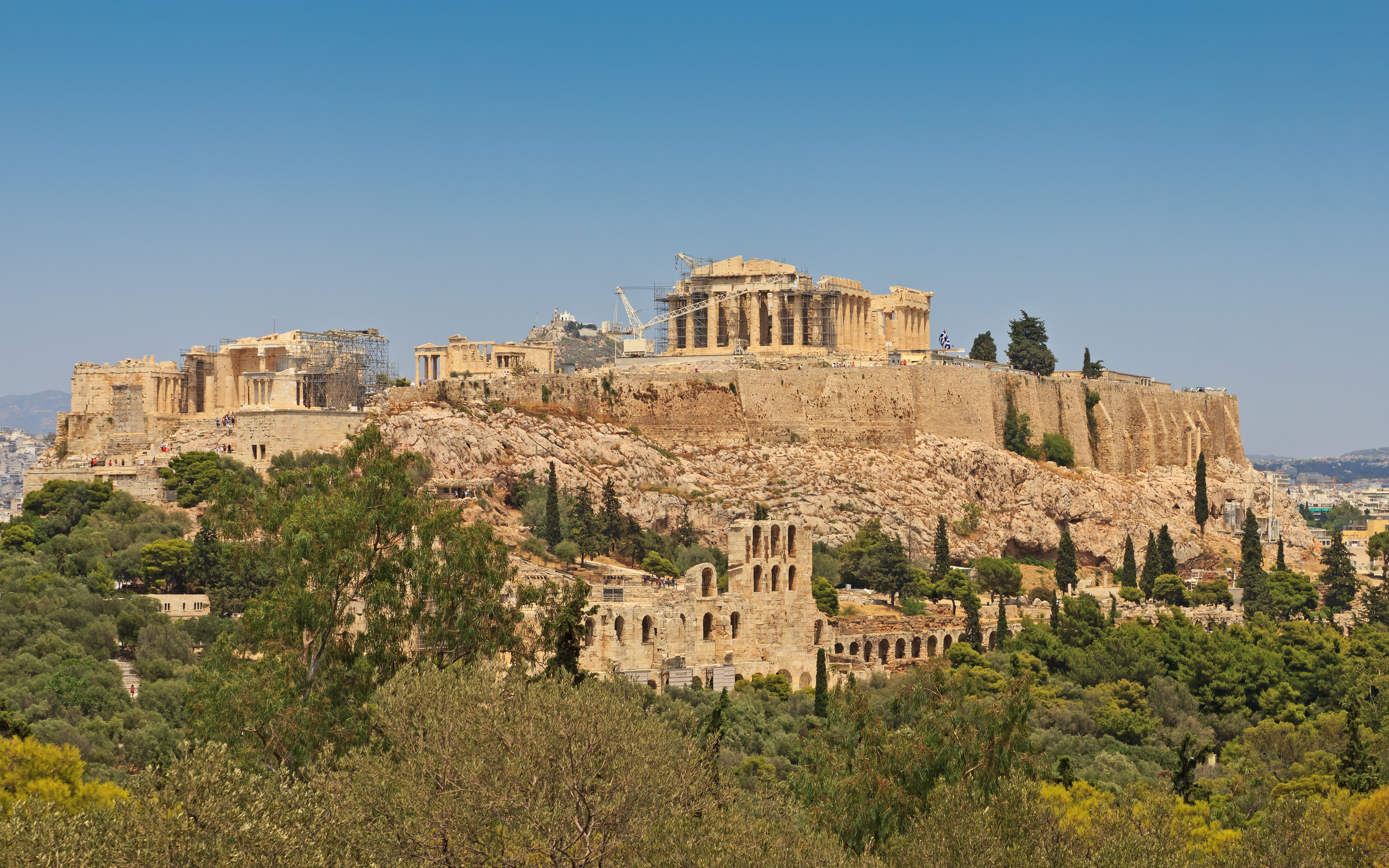
The Parthenon's position on the Acropolis dominates the city skyline of Athens.

A major fire broke out in the Parthenon shortly after the middle of the third century AD. which destroyed the roof and much of the sanctuary's interior. Heruli pirates sacked Athens in 276, and destroyed most of the public buildings there, including the Parthenon. Repairs were made in the fourth century AD, possibly during the reign of Julian the Apostate. A new wooden roof overlaid with clay tiles was installed to cover the sanctuary. It sloped at a greater angle than the original roof and left the building's wings exposed.

The Parthenon survived as a temple dedicated to Athena for nearly 1,000 years until Theodosius II, during the Persecution of pagans in the late Roman Empire, decreed in 435 that all pagan temples in the Eastern Roman Empire be closed. It is debated exactly when during the 5th century that the closure of the Parthenon as a temple was put into practice. It is suggested to have occurred in c. 481–484, on the order of Emperor Zeno, because the temple had been the focus of Pagan Hellenic opposition against Zeno in Athens in support of Illus, who had promised to restore Hellenic rites to the temples that were still standing.

At some point in the fifth century, Athena's great cult image was looted by one of the emperors and taken to Constantinople, where it was later destroyed, possibly during the siege and sack of Constantinople during the Fourth Crusade in 1204 AD.

=== Christian church ===
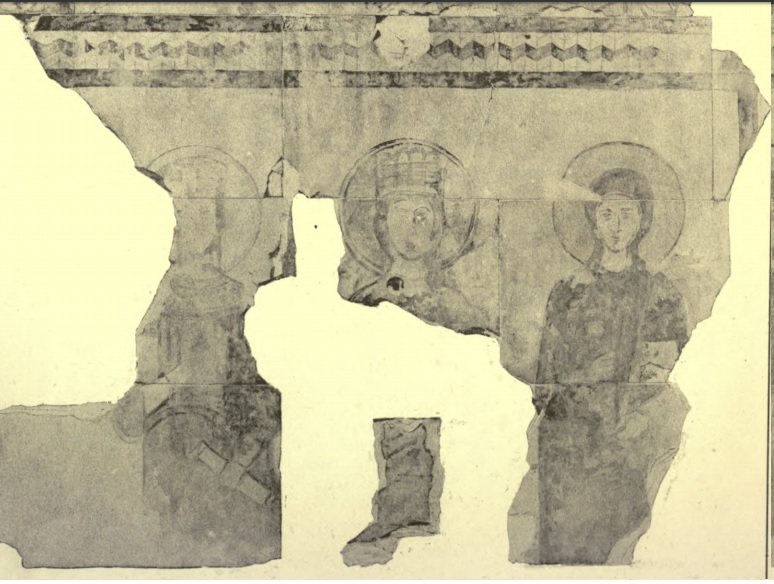
Now-lost Byzantine wall painting of the Christian Parthenon as sketched by Marquis de Bute in 1885

Inscription related to 12th-century works of the Christian Parthenon

The Parthenon was converted into a Christian church in the final decades of the fifth century to become the Church of the Parthenos Maria (Virgin Mary) or the Church of the Theotokos (Mother of God). The orientation of the building was changed to face towards the east; the main entrance was placed at the building's western end, and the Christian altar and iconostasis were situated towards the building's eastern side adjacent to an apse built where the temple's pronaos was formerly located. A large central portal with surrounding side-doors was made in the wall dividing the cella, which became the church's nave, and from the rear chamber, the church's narthex. The spaces between the columns of the opisthodomos and the peristyle were walled up, though a number of doorways still permitted access. Icons were painted on the walls, and many Christian inscriptions were carved into the Parthenon's columns. These renovations inevitably led to the removal and dispersal of some of the sculptures. Sometime after the Parthenon was converted to a Christian church, the metopes of the north, west and east facades of the Parthenon were defaced by Christians in order to remove images of pagan deities. The damage was so extensive that the images on the affected metopes often can't be confidently identified.

The Parthenon became the fourth most important Christian pilgrimage destination in the Eastern Roman Empire after Constantinople, Ephesos, and Thessaloniki. In 1018, the emperor Basil II went on a pilgrimage to Athens after his final victory over the First Bulgarian Empire for the sole purpose of worshipping at the Parthenon. In medieval Greek accounts it is called the Temple of Theotokos Atheniotissa and often indirectly referred to as famous without explaining exactly which temple they were referring to, thus establishing that it was indeed well known.

At the time of the Latin occupation, it became for about 250 years a Latin Catholic church of Our Lady. During this period a tower, used either as a watchtower or bell tower and containing a spiral staircase, was constructed at the southwest corner of the cella, and vaulted tombs were built beneath the Parthenon's floor.

=== Rediscovery of the Parthenon ===
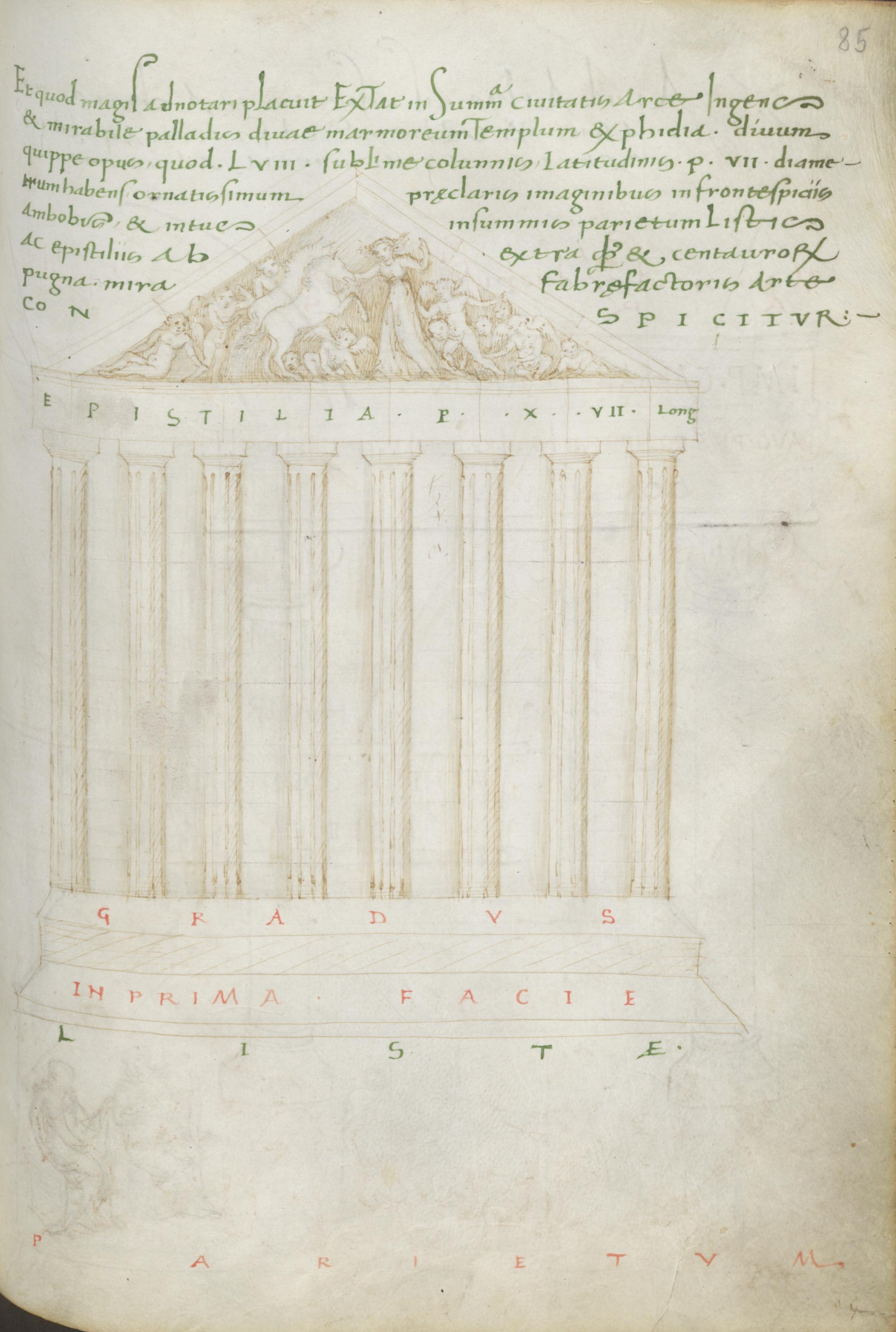
The oldest extant drawing of the Parthenon is found in Manuscript Hamilton 254 on folio 85r, a fifteenth-century manuscript preserved in the Berlin State Library.

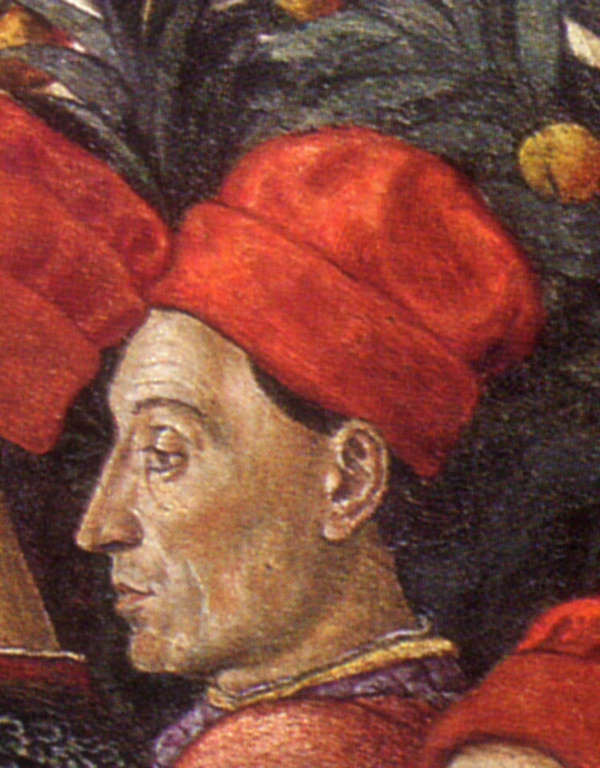
The humanist Cyriacus of Ancona, who revealed the existence of the Parthenon after it had fallen into oblivion in the Middle Ages

The rediscovery of the Parthenon as an ancient monument dates back to the period of Renaissance humanism. In 1436, Cyriacus of Ancona became the first figure after antiquity to describe the Parthenon and to call it by its name, which he had read many times in ancient texts, including that of Pausanias. Ciriaco re-established the Parthenon as being a "temple of the goddess Athena", unlike previous travellers who had called it the "church of the Virgin Mary":

...mirabile Palladis Divae marmoreum templum, divum quippe opus Phidiae ("...the wonderful temple of the goddess Athena, a divine work of Phidias").

=== Islamic mosque ===
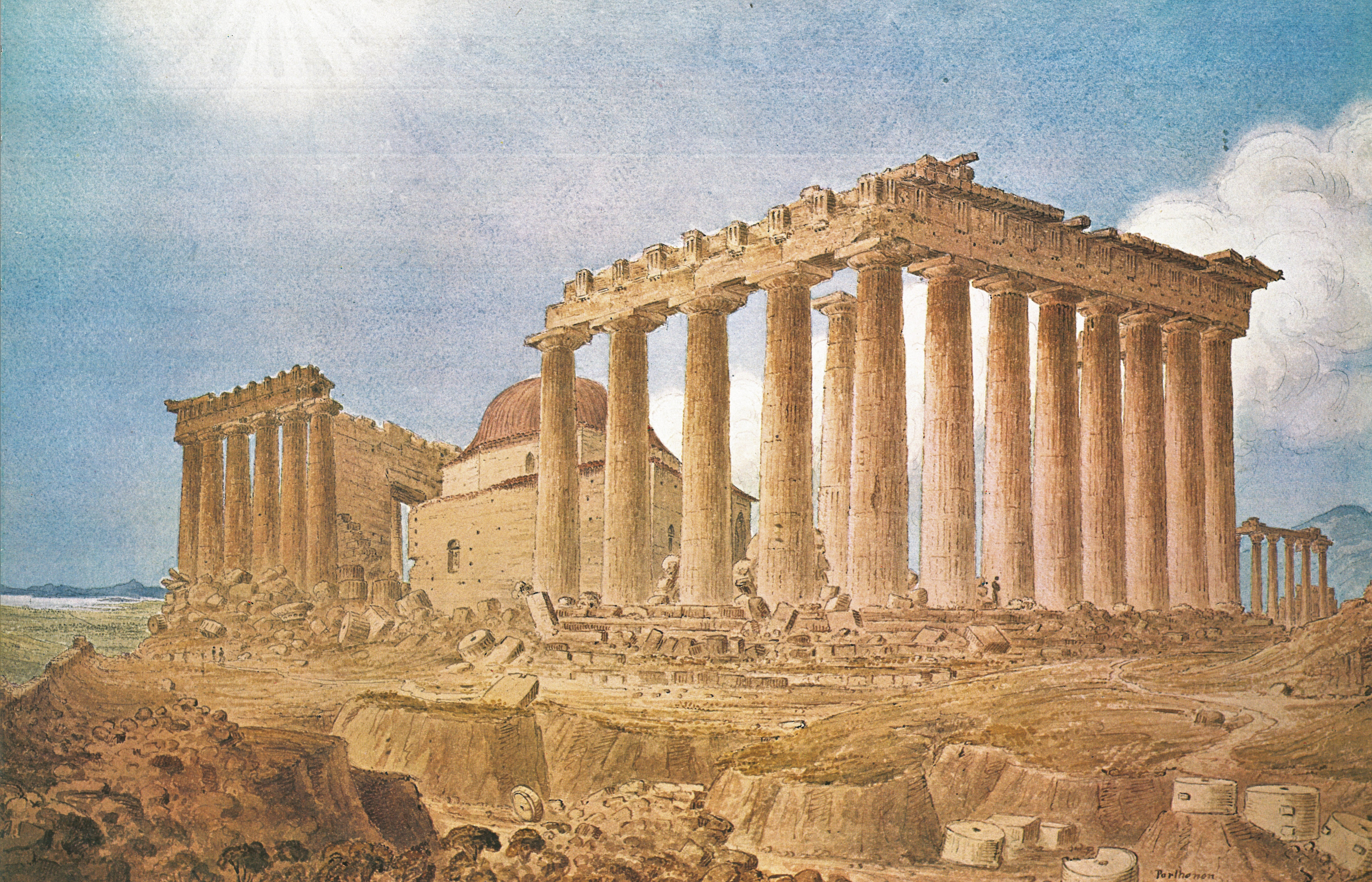
Drawing of the Parthenon by James Skene, 1838

In 1456, Ottoman Turkish forces invaded Athens and laid siege to a Florentine army defending the Acropolis until June 1458, when it surrendered to the Turks. The Turks may have briefly restored the Parthenon to the Greek Orthodox Christians for continued use as a church. Some time before the end of the fifteenth century, the Parthenon became a mosque.

The precise circumstances under which the Turks appropriated it for use as a mosque are unclear; one account states that Mehmed II ordered its conversion as punishment for an Athenian plot against Ottoman rule. The apse was repurposed into a mihrab, the tower previously constructed during the Roman Catholic occupation of the Parthenon was extended upwards to become a minaret, a minbar was installed, the Christian altar and iconostasis were removed, and the walls were whitewashed to cover icons of Christian saints and other Christian imagery.

Despite the alterations accompanying the Parthenon's conversion into a church and subsequently a mosque, its structure had remained basically intact. In 1667, the Turkish traveller Evliya Çelebi expressed marvel at the Parthenon's sculptures and figuratively described the building as "like some impregnable fortress not made by human agency". He composed a poetic supplication stating that, as "a work less of human hands than of Heaven itself, [it] should remain standing for all time". The French artist Jacques Carrey in 1674 visited the Acropolis and sketched the Parthenon's sculptural decorations. Early in 1687, an engineer named Plantier sketched the Parthenon for the Frenchman Graviers d'Ortières. These depictions, particularly Carrey's, provide important, and sometimes the only, evidence of the condition of the Parthenon and its various sculptures prior to the devastation it suffered in late 1687 and the subsequent looting of its art objects.

=== Partial destruction ===
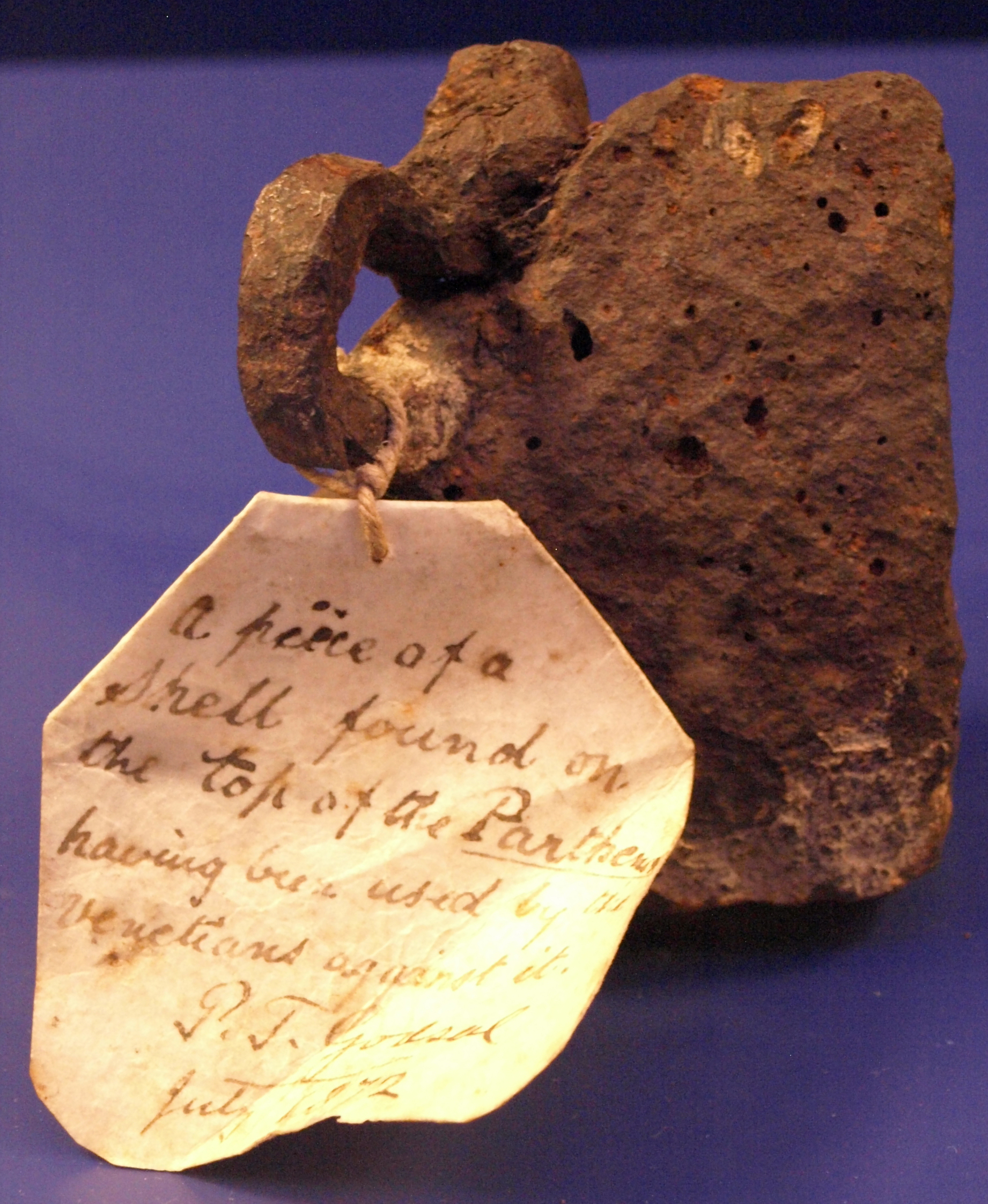
Fragment of an exploded shell found on top of a wall in the Parthenon, thought to originate from the time of the Venetian siege

As part of the Morean War (1684–1699), the Venetians sent an expedition led by Francesco Morosini to attack Athens and capture the Acropolis. The Ottomans fortified the Acropolis and used the Parthenon as a gunpowder magazine – despite having been forewarned of the dangers of this use by the 1656 explosion that severely damaged the Propylaea – and as a shelter for members of the local Turkish community.

On 26 September 1687 a Venetian mortar round, fired from the Hill of Philopappos, blew up the magazine. The explosion blew out the building's central portion and caused the cella's walls to crumble into rubble. According to Greek architect and archaeologist Kornilia Chatziaslani:

...three of the sanctuary's four walls nearly collapsed and three-fifths of the sculptures from the frieze fell. Nothing of the roof apparently remained in place. Six columns from the south side fell, eight from the north, as well as whatever remained from the eastern porch, except for one column. The columns brought down with them the enormous marble architraves, triglyphs, and metopes.

About three hundred people were killed in the explosion, which showered marble fragments over nearby Turkish defenders and sparked fires that destroyed many homes.

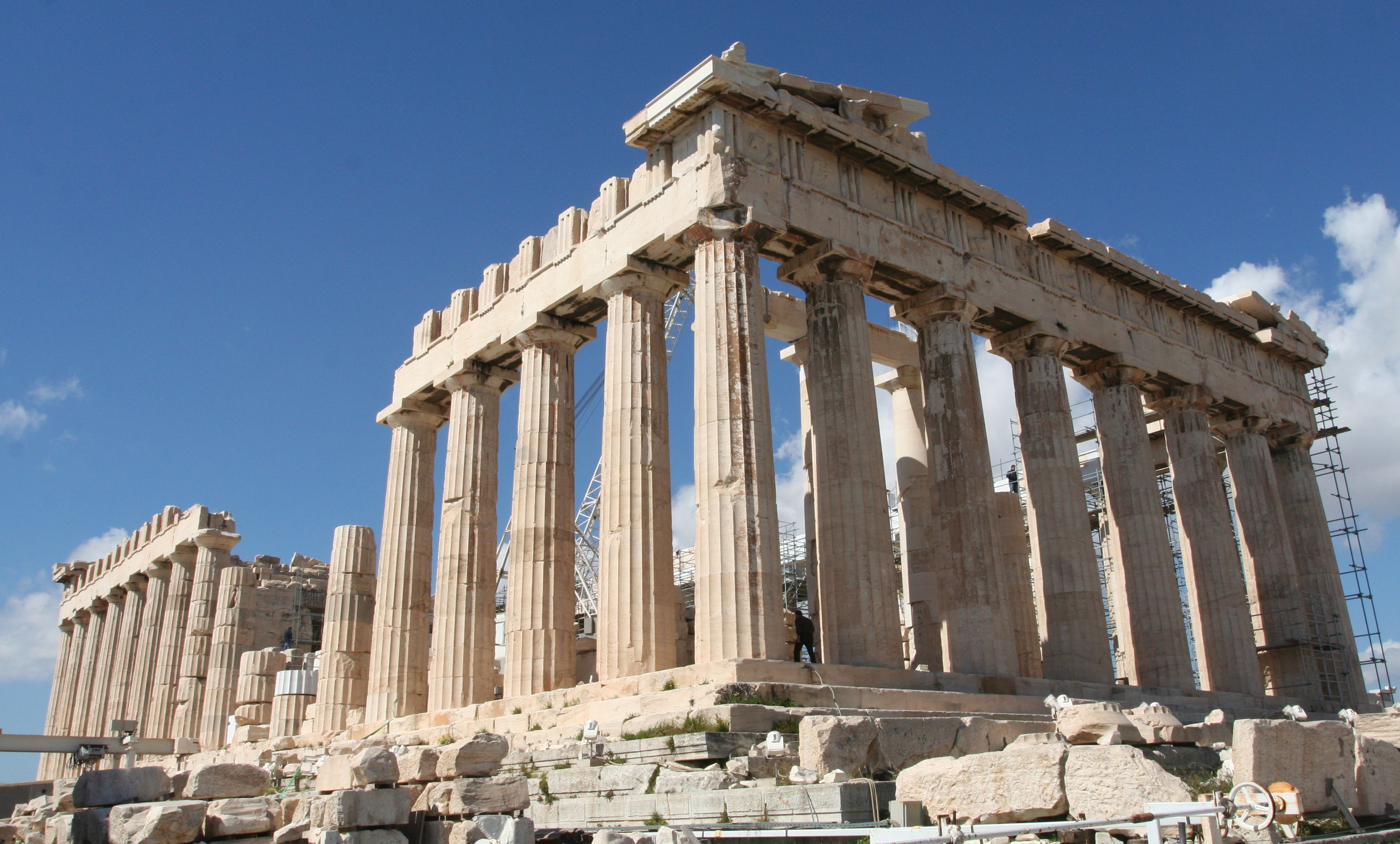
The southern side of the Parthenon, which sustained considerable damage in the 1687 explosion (photo taken in 2009)

Accounts written at the time conflict over whether this destruction was deliberate or accidental; one such account, written by the German officer Sobievolski, states that a Turkish deserter revealed to Morosini the use to which the Turks had put the Parthenon, expecting that the Venetians would not target a building of such historic importance. Morosini was said to have responded by directing his artillery to aim at the Parthenon. Subsequently, Morosini sought to loot sculptures from the ruin and caused further damage in the process. Sculptures of Poseidon and Athena's horses fell to the ground and smashed as his soldiers tried to detach them from the building's west pediment.

In 1688 the Venetians abandoned Athens to avoid a confrontation with a large force the Turks had assembled at Chalcis; at that time, the Venetians had considered blowing up what remained of the Parthenon along with the rest of the Acropolis to deny its further use as a fortification to the Turks, but that idea was not pursued.

Once the Turks had recaptured the Acropolis, they used some of the rubble produced by this explosion to erect a smaller mosque within the shell of the ruined Parthenon. For the next century and a half, parts of the remaining structure were looted for building material and especially valuable objects.

The 18th century was a period of Ottoman stagnation—so that many more Europeans found access to Athens, and the picturesque ruins of the Parthenon were much drawn and painted, spurring a rise in philhellenism and helping to arouse sympathy in Britain and France for Greek independence. Amongst those early travellers and archaeologists were James Stuart and Nicholas Revett, who were commissioned by the Society of Dilettanti to survey the ruins of classical Athens. They produced the first measured drawings of the Parthenon, published in 1787 in the second volume of Antiquities of Athens Measured and Delineated.

From 1801 to 1812, agents of Thomas Bruce, 7th Earl of Elgin, removed about half the surviving Parthenon sculptures, sending them to Britain in efforts to establish a private museum. Elgin stated he removed the sculptures with permission of the Ottoman officials who exercised authority in Athens at the time. The legality of Elgin's actions has been disputed.

=== War of Independence ===
During the Greek War of Independence (1821–1833) which ended the 355-year Ottoman rule of Athens, the Acropolis was besieged twice, first by the Greeks in 1821–22 and then by the Ottoman forces in 1826–27. During the first siege, the besieged Ottoman forces attempted to melt the lead in the columns of the Parthenon to cast bullets. During the second siege, the Parthenon was significantly damaged by Ottoman artillery fire.

=== Independent Greece ===
When independent Greece gained control of Athens in 1832, the visible section of the minaret was demolished; only its base and spiral staircase up to the level of the architrave remain intact. Soon all the medieval and Ottoman buildings on the Acropolis were destroyed. The image of the small mosque within the Parthenon's cella has been preserved in Pierre-Gustave Joly de Lotbinière's photograph, published in Lerebours's Excursions Daguerriennes in 1842: the first photograph of the Acropolis. The area became a historical precinct controlled by the Greek government. In the later 19th century, the Parthenon was widely considered by Americans and Europeans to be the pinnacle of human architectural achievement, and became a popular destination and subject of artists, including Frederic Edwin Church and Sanford Robinson Gifford. Today it attracts millions of tourists every year, who travel up the path at the western end of the Acropolis, through the restored Propylaea, and up the Panathenaic Way to the Parthenon, which is surrounded by a low fence to prevent damage.

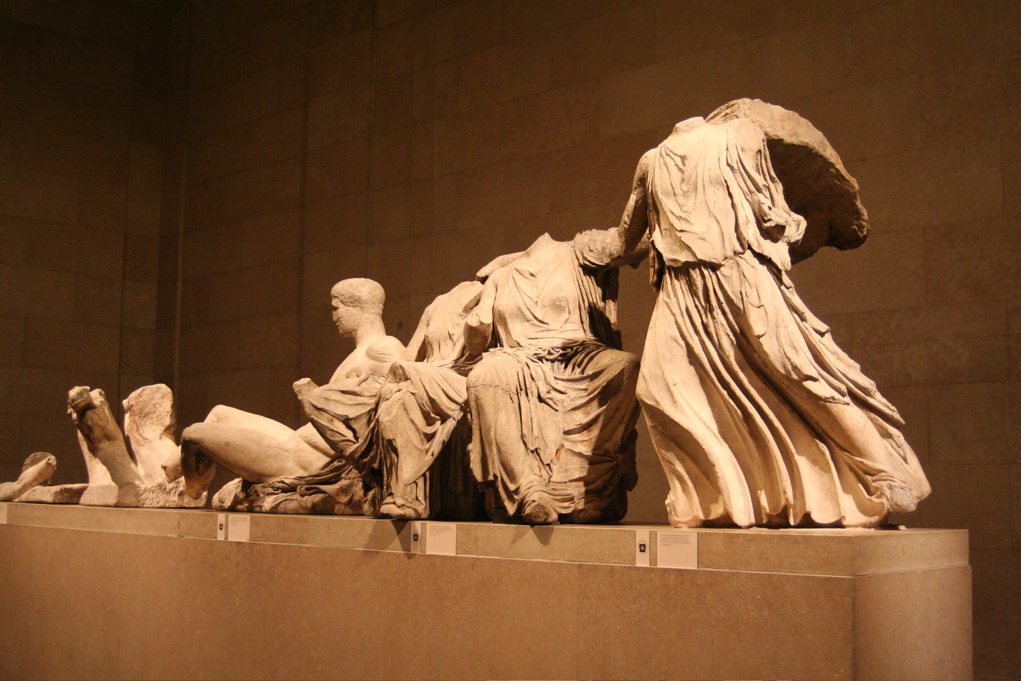
Life-size pediment sculptures from the Parthenon in the British Museum

=== Dispute over the marbles ===
The dispute centres around those of the Parthenon Marbles removed by Elgin, which are in the British Museum. A few sculptures from the Parthenon are also in the Louvre in Paris, in Copenhagen, and elsewhere, while more than half are in the Acropolis Museum in Athens. A few can still be seen on the building itself. In 1983, the Greek government formally asked the UK government to return the sculptures in the British Museum to Greece, and subsequently listed the dispute with UNESCO. The British Museum has consistently refused to return the sculptures, and successive British governments have been unwilling to force the museum to do so (which would require legislation). In 2021, UNESCO called upon the UK government to resolve the issue at the intergovernmental level. Discussions between UK and Greek officials are ongoing.

Four pieces of the sculptures have been repatriated to Greece: 3 from the Vatican, and 1 from a museum in Sicily.

== Restoration ==
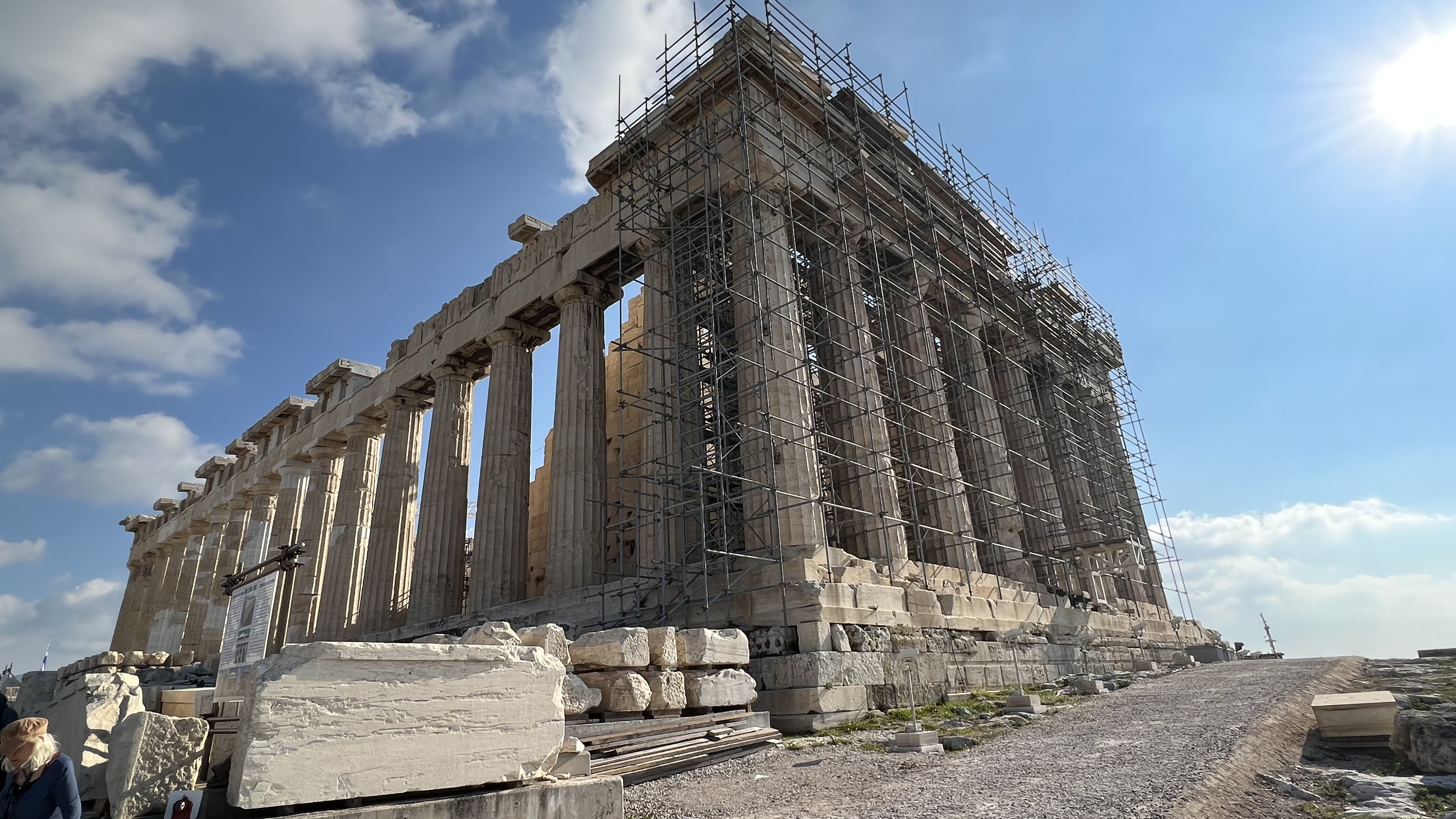
Parthenon in January 2023

In 1981, an earthquake caused damage to the east façade. Air pollution and acid rain have damaged the marble and stonework.

An organised effort to preserve and restore buildings on the Acropolis began in 1975, when the Greek government established the Committee for the Conservation of the Acropolis Monuments (ESMA). That group of interdisciplinary specialist scholars oversees the academic understanding of the site to guide restoration efforts. The project later attracted funding and technical assistance from the European Union. An archaeological committee thoroughly documented every artefact remaining on the site, and architects assisted with computer models to determine their original locations. Particularly important and fragile sculptures were transferred to the Acropolis Museum.

A crane was installed for moving marble blocks; the crane was designed to fold away beneath the roofline when not in use. In some cases, prior re-constructions were found to be incorrect. These were dismantled, and a careful process of restoration began.

Originally, various blocks were held together by elongated iron H pins that were completely coated in lead, which protected the iron from corrosion. Stabilising pins added in the 19th century were not lead-coated, and corroded. Since the corrosion product (rust) is expansive, the expansion caused further damage by cracking the marble.

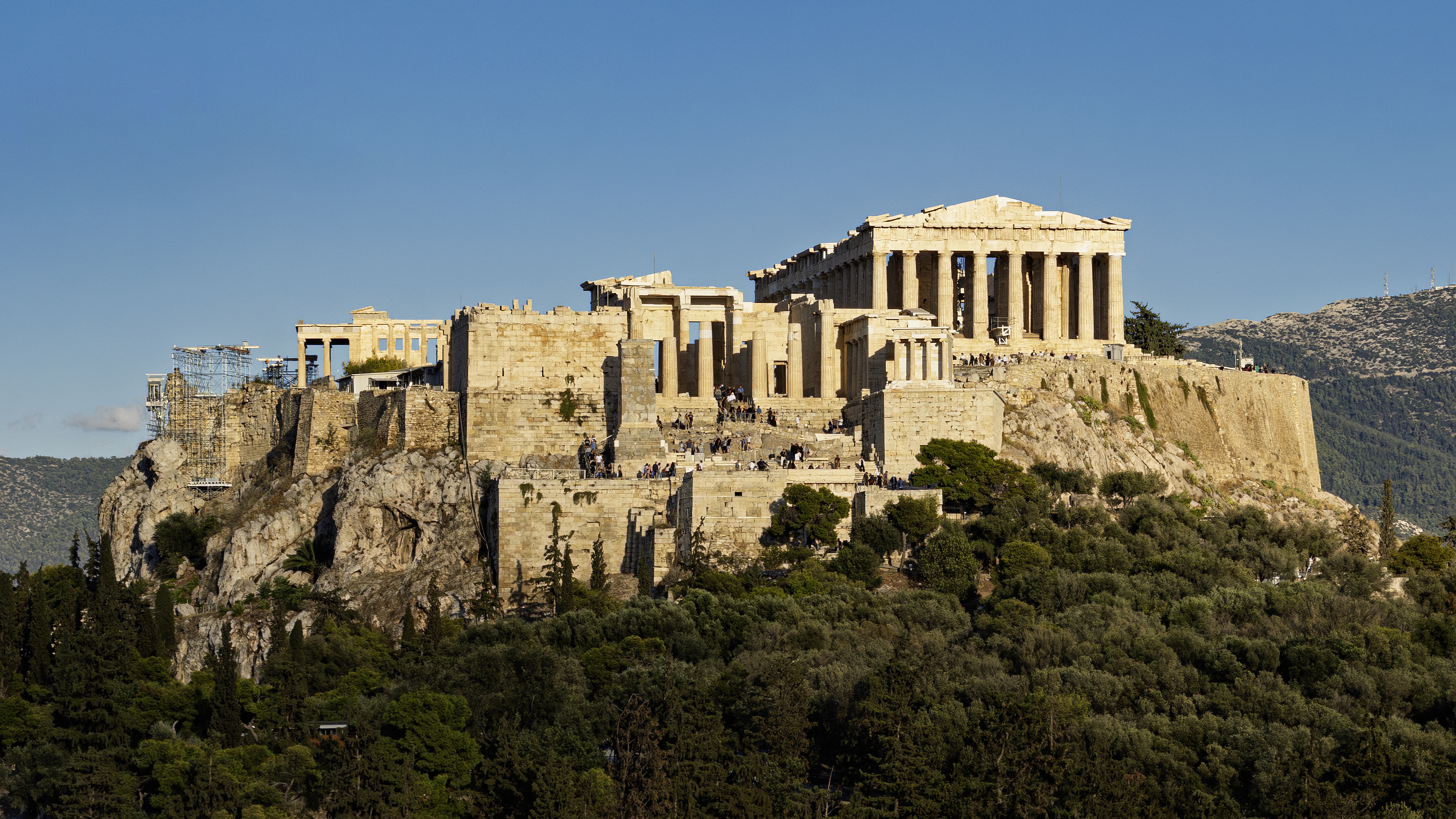
The Acropolis of Athens as seen from the Pnyx in October 2025 with the scaffolding on the west façade of the Parthenon removed after 15 years

The last remaining slabs from the western section of the Parthenon frieze were removed from the monument in 1993 for fear of further damage. They have now been transported to the new Acropolis Museum. Until cleaning of the remaining sculptures was completed in 2005, black crusts and coatings were present on the marble surface. Between 20 January and the end of March 2008, 4200 items (sculptures, inscriptions small terracotta objects), including some 80 artefacts dismantled from the monuments in recent years, were removed from the old museum on the Acropolis to the new Acropolis Museum.

In 2019, Greece's Central Archaeological Council approved a restoration of the interior cella's north wall (along with parts of others). The project will reinstate as many as 360 ancient stones, and install 90 new pieces of Pentelic marble, minimising the use of new material as much as possible. The eventual result of these restorations will be a partial restoration of some or most of each wall of the interior cella.

Since the 19th century, the Parthenon's exterior has been encased in various extents of scaffolding until September 2025, when the scaffolding on the western side was removed temporarily. The Greek government says that it intends to remove all scaffolding from the monument altogether by 2026 after the completion of restoration works. The Parthenon's fully restored west pediment was unveiled in June 2026.

== Sources ==
- Berger, E., ed. (1984). Der parthenon-kongress Basel referate und berichte, 4 bis 8 april 1982, 2 vols. Mainz.
- Burkert, Walter (1985). Greek Religion. Harvard University Press. ISBN 978-0-674-36281-9.
- Connelly, Joan Breton (1 January 1996). "Parthenon and Parthenoi: A Mythological Interpretation of the Parthenon Frieze" (PDF). American Journal of Archaeology. 100 (1): 53–80. doi:10.2307/506297. JSTOR 506297. S2CID 41120274. Archived from the original (PDF) on 19 August 2018.
- Connelly, Joan Breton (2014). The Parthenon Enigma: A New Understanding of the West's Most Iconic Building and the People who Made It. Random House. ISBN 978-0-307-47659-3.
- D'Ooge, Martin Luther (1909). The Acropolis of Athens. Macmillan.
- Fett, B. (2006). "An In-depth Investigation of the Divine Ratio". The Mathematics Enthusiast. 3 (2): 157–175. doi:10.54870/1551-3440.1047.
- Frazer, Sir James George (1998). "The King of the Woods". The Golden Bough: A Study in Magic and Religion. Oxford University Press. ISBN 978-0-19-283541-3.
- Gamwell, L. (2016). Mathematics and Art: A Cultural History. Princeton.
- Goodyear, William Henry (1912). Greek Refinements: Studies in Temperamental Architecture. Yale.
- Haselberger, Lothar, ed. (1999). Appearance and Essence: Refinements of Classical Architecture - Curvature. Pennsylvania.
- Hurwit, Jeffrey M. (2000). The Athenian Acropolis: History, Mythology, and Archeology from the Neolithic Era to the Present. Cambridge University Press. ISBN 978-0-521-42834-7.
- Hurwit, Jeffrey M. (2005). "The Parthenon and the Temple of Zeus at Olympia". In Judith M. Barringer; Jeffrey M. Hurwit; Jerome Jordan Pollitt (eds.). Periklean Athens and Its Legacy: Problems and Perspectives. University of Texas Press. ISBN 978-0-292-70622-4.
- Jones, Mark Wilson (2000). "Doric Measure and Architectural Design 1: The Evidence of the Relief from Salamis". American Journal of Archaeology. 104 (1): 73–93. doi:10.2307/506793. JSTOR 506793.
- Jones, Mark Wilson (2018). "Approaches to Architectural Proportion and the "Poor old Parthenon"". In Cohen, M.; Delbeke, M. (eds.). Proportional Systems in the History of Architecture. Leiden.
- Lawrence, A. (1996). Greek Architecture. Yale.
- Markowsky, G (1992). "Misconceptions about the Golden Ratio". The College Mathematics Journal. 23 (1): 2–19. doi:10.1080/07468342.1992.11973428.
- Neils, J., ed. (2005). The Parthenon: From Antiquity to the Present. Cambridge.
- Pelling, Christopher (1997). "Tragedy and Religion: Constructs and Readings". Greek Tragedy and the Historian. Oxford University Press. ISBN 978-0-19-814987-3.
- Pennethorne, John (1878). The Geometry and Optics of Ancient Architecture: illustrated by examples from Thebes, Athens, and Rome. Williams and Norgate.
- Penrose, F.C. (1888). An Investigation Into the Principles of Athenian Architecture (2 ed.). MacMillan & Co.
- Robertson, D.S. (1986). Greek and Roman Architecture (2 ed.). Cambridge.
- Tarbell, F. B. (1930). A History of Ancient Greek Art. The Macmillan Company.
- Tournikiotis, Panayotis, ed. (1996). The Parthenon and its Impact in Modern Times. Abrams.
- Whitley, James (2001). "The Archaeology of Democracy: Classical Athens". The Archaeology of Ancient Greece. Cambridge University Press. ISBN 978-0-521-62733-7.
- Winter, Frederick E. (1980). "Tradition and Innovation in Doric Design III: The Work of Iktinos". American Journal of Archaeology. 84 (4): 399–416. doi:10.2307/504069. JSTOR 504069. S2CID 192992538.
