= Karpion =

Greek architect, fifth-century BC

Karpion was an ancient Greek architect and architectural theorist active in the fifth century BC. On the testimony of Vitruvius (7, praefatio 12) he and Iktinos co-authored a treatise on the proportions of the Parthenon, the major Periklean Temple of Athena on the Acropolis of Athens.
