= Stylobate =

Base of a Greek temple's colonnades

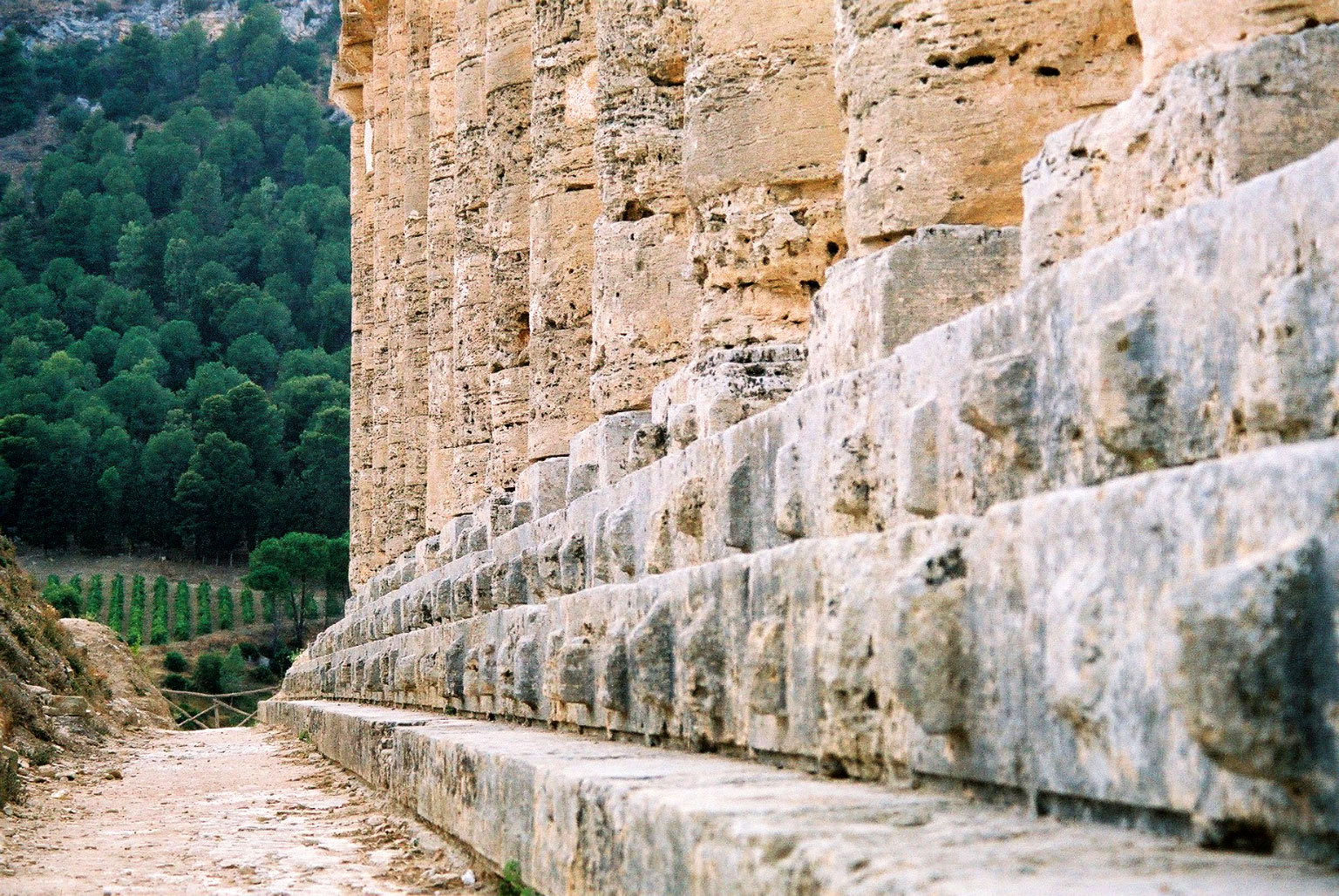
Triple-stepped crepidoma with stylobate at top, in the Doric Temple of Segesta, Sicily

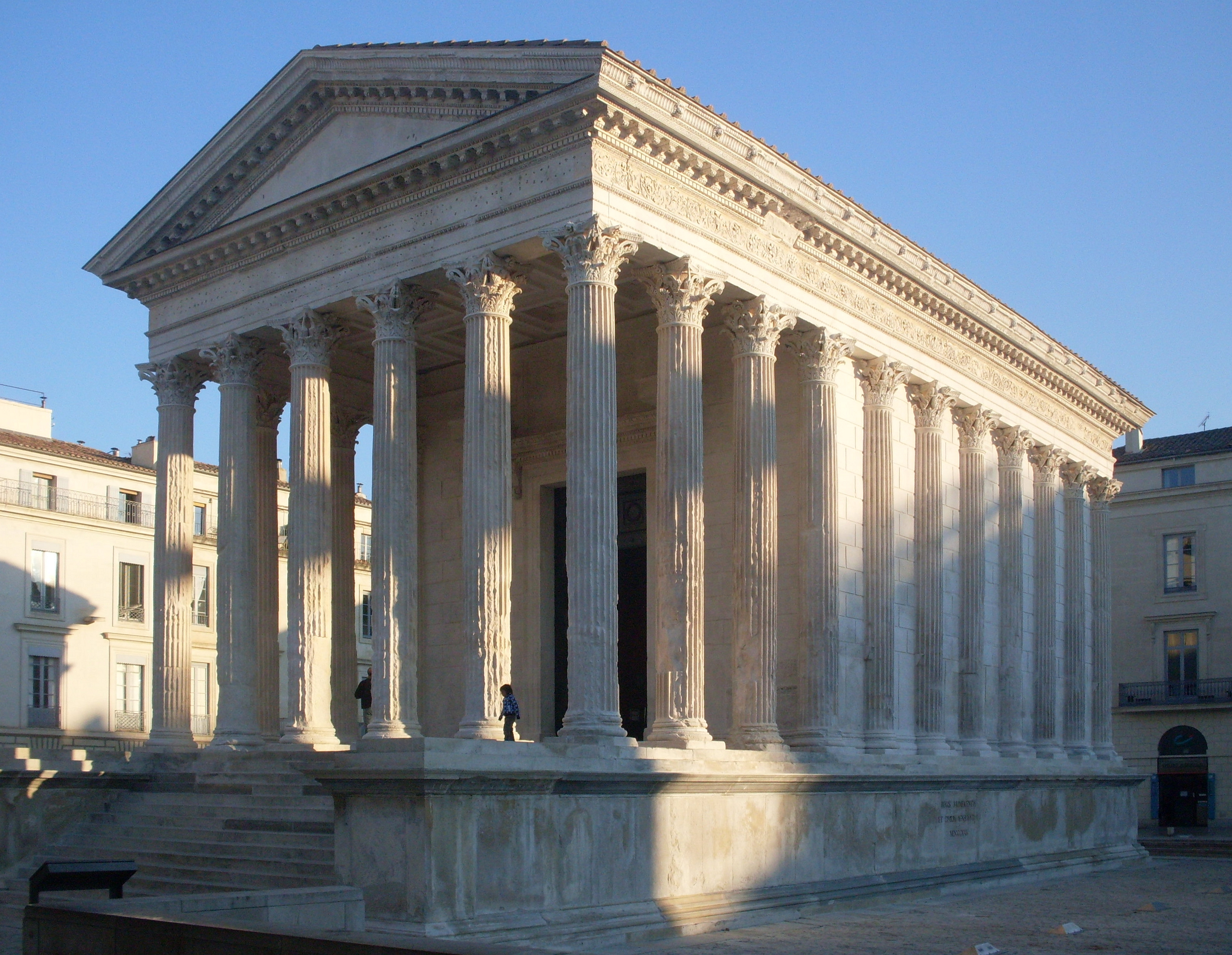
The Roman Maison Carrée, Nîmes, illustrating the Roman version of a stylobate.

Use stylobate compared with Doric, Tuscan, Ionic, Corinthian and Composite orders

In classical Greek architecture, a stylobate (Greek: στυλοβάτης) is the top step of the crepidoma, the stepped platform upon which colonnades of temple columns are placed (it is the floor of the temple). The platform was built on a leveling course that flattened out the ground immediately beneath the temple.

== Etymology ==
The term stylobate comes from the Ancient Greek στυλοβάτης, consisting of στῦλος (stylos), "column", and βαίνειν (bainein), "to stride, walk".

== Terminology ==
Some methodologies use the word stylobate to describe only the topmost step of the temple's base, while stereobate is used to describe the remaining steps of the platform beneath the stylobate and just above the leveling course. Others, like John Lord, use the term to refer to the entire platform.

== Architectural use ==
The stylobate was often designed to relate closely to the dimensions of other elements of the temple. In Greek Doric temples, the length and width of the stylobate were related, and in some early Doric temples the column height was one third the width of the stylobate. The Romans, following Etruscan architectural tradition, took a different approach in using a much higher stylobate that typically had steps only in the front, leading to the portico.

In modern architecture the stylobate is the upper part of the stepped basement of the building, or the common basement floor, combining several buildings. Today, stylobates are popular in use in the construction of high-rise buildings.

== See also ==
- Scamilli impares
