= Jacques Carrey =

French painter (1649–1726)

Jacques Carrey (12 January 1649 – 18 February 1726) was a French painter and draughtsman, now remembered almost exclusively for the series of drawings he made of the Parthenon, Athens, in 1674.

Born in Troyes, Carrey was a pupil in the atelier of Charles Le Brun. Carrey was recommended by his master to be included in the entourage of the embassy of de Nointel to Constantinople in August 1670 as a draughtsman. Part of de Nointel's commission was to purchase manuscripts, medallions and sculptures while abroad. As a result of this, between 1670 and 1679 Carrey executed over 500 drawings of towns, antiquities, ceremonies and examples of local fetes and customs in Asia Minor, Greece and Palestine.

De Nointel's group visited Athens in November 1674. Here, in a two-week period, Carrey produced about fifty-five drawings of the sculptures on the Parthenon. Thirty-five of these, showing details of the pediments, metopes and frieze, now survive in the Paris Bibliotheque Nationale. Since a large number of the Parthenon's sculpture was destroyed in the Venetian bombardment of 1687 and from exposure in subsequent centuries, Carrey's work is priceless and the sole record of much of missing sections. His red and black chalk drawings, probably taken from life, meticulously record the cracks and other damage, making no attempt to complete missing details.

On returning to Paris in 1679 Carrey presented Le Brun with the drawings he had made in Constantinople; several are in the Cabinet des Dessins at the Louvre, Paris. Three paintings known to have been made by Carrey in 1675 are presently unknown, but the painting depicting de Nointel before the City of Athens in the Musée des Beaux-Arts, Chartres is almost certainly his. He is also known to have painted a cycle of six paintings of the life of Saint Pantaleon for Église Saint-Pantaléon, Troyes. He died in his home city, aged 77.

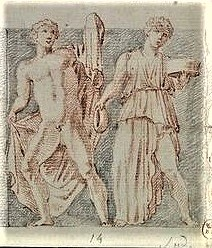
Metope South 14, known only from this drawing.

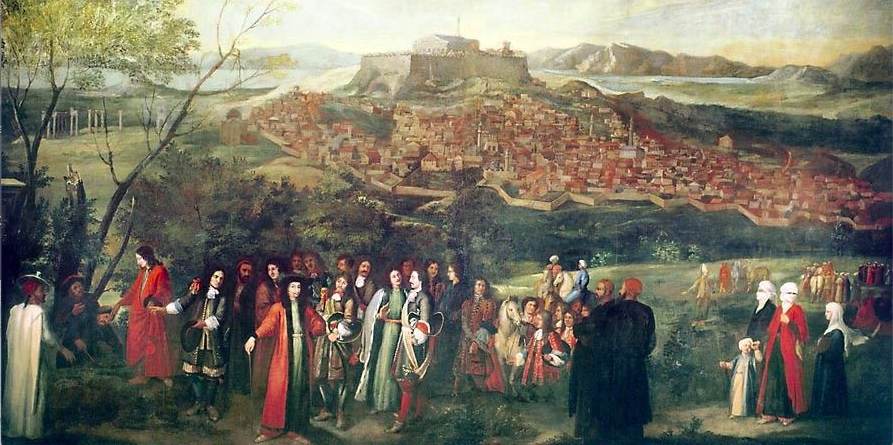
The embassy of the Marquis de Nointel in Athens in 1674, Jacques Carrey, Museum of Fine Arts of Chartres.

== Bibliography ==
- Corrard de Breban, Recherches Jacques Carrey, pentre troyen, Mémoires de la Société Académique de l'Aube, 1864. p. 77-91
- H. Omont, Athenes au XVIIe siecle. Dessins des sculptures du Parthenon attribues a Jacques Carrey et conservès à la Bibltothèque Nationale, accompagnès de vues et plans d Athènes et de l'Acropole., Paris, 1898
- R. Heberdey: Untersuchungen zu den Zeichnungen Jacques Carrey's, Jhft. Österreich. Archäol. Inst. Wien, xxxi (1939), pp. 96–141
- T. Bowie and D. Thimme, The Carrey Drawings of the Parthenon Sculptures, Bloomington, Indiana University Press, 1971.
