= Siege of the Acropolis (1687) =

Part of the Morean War

- Part of the Morean War
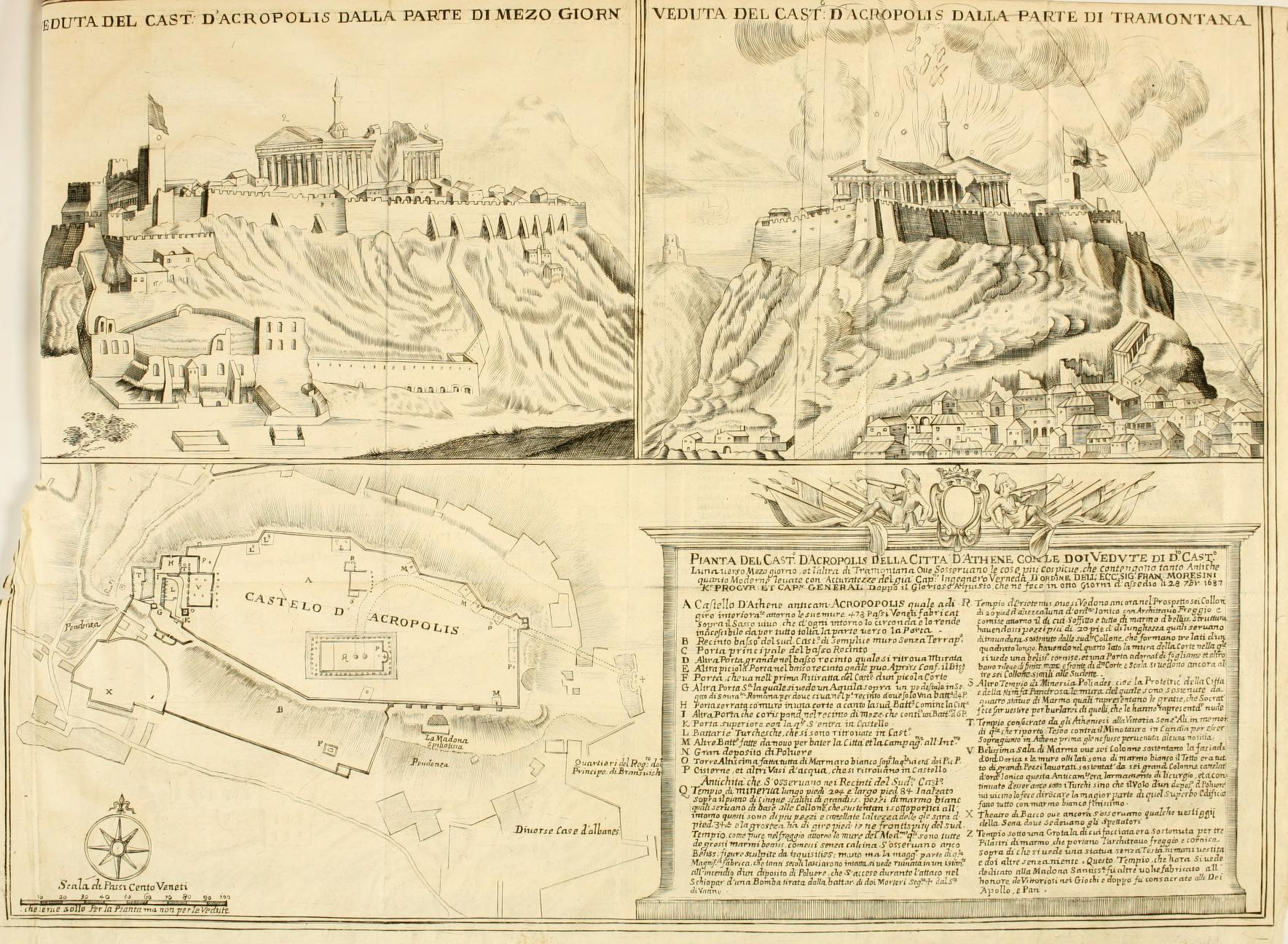
- The Acropolis at the time of the siege. The trajectory of the shell that hit the Parthenon, causing its explosion, is marked.
| Date | 23–29 September 1687 |
| Location | Athens 37.97153°N 23.72574°E |
| Result | Surrender of the Acropolis of Athens; destruction of the Parthenon |

Belligerents
| Republic of Venice | Greek mercenaries | Ottoman Empire |

Commanders and leaders
| Francesco Morosini; Otto Wilhelm Königsmarck | Unknown | |

Strength
| 10,750 | Unknown | |

The siege of the Acropolis took place on 23–29 September 1687, as the Venetian forces under Francesco Morosini and Otto Wilhelm Königsmarck laid siege to the Acropolis of Athens, held by the Ottoman garrison of the city. The siege resulted in the destruction of a large part of the Parthenon, which the Ottomans used as a gunpowder store.

== Siege ==
As part of the Morean War, the Venetians had landed on the Peloponnese peninsula (then known as "Morea") in southern Greece, and in a series of campaigns in 1685–1687 had managed to wrest it from the Ottoman forces holding it. The Venetian position in the Morea was unsafe, however, as the Ottoman strongholds of Thebes and Negroponte (Chalkis) provided the Ottoman Empire with excellent bases for an invasion and reconquest of the peninsula. As a result, the Venetian commanders, under Francesco Morosini, decided to expand their campaign into eastern Central Greece, with Athens as the first target. On 21 September 1687, Königsmarck's army, 10,750 men strong, landed at Eleusis, while the Venetian fleet entered Piraeus. The Turks quickly evacuated the town of Athens, but the garrison withdrew to the ancient Acropolis of Athens, determined to hold out until reinforcements arrived from Thebes. The Venetian army set up cannon and mortar batteries on the Pnyx and other heights around the city and began a siege of the Acropolis. The Ottomans first demolished the Temple of Athena Nike to erect a cannon battery, and on 25 September, a Venetian cannonball exploded a powder magazine in the Propylaea. The most important damage caused was the destruction of the Parthenon. The Turks used the temple for ammunition storage, and when, on the evening of 26 September 1687, a mortar shell hit the building, the resulting explosion killed 300 people and led to the complete destruction of the temple's roof and most of the walls. Despite the enormous destruction caused by the "miraculous shot", as Morosini called it, the Turks continued to defend the fort until a relief attempt from the Ottoman army from Thebes was repulsed by Königsmarck on 28 September. The garrison then capitulated, on condition of being transported to Smyrna, on the next day.

== Aftermath ==
Despite the fall of Athens, Morosini's position was not secure. The Ottomans were amassing an army at Thebes, and their 2,000-strong cavalry effectively controlled Attica, limiting the Venetians to the environs of Athens, so that the Venetians had to establish forts to secure the road linking Athens to Piraeus. On 26 December, the 1,400-strong remnant of the Hannoverian contingent departed, and a new outbreak of the plague during the winter further weakened the Venetian forces. The Venetians managed to recruit 500 Arvanites from the rural population of Attica as soldiers, but no other Greeks were willing to join the Venetian army. In a council on 31 December, it was decided to abandon Athens and focus on other projects, such as the conquest of Negroponte. A camp was fortified at the Munychia to cover the evacuation, and it was suggested, but not agreed on, that the walls of the Acropolis should be razed. As the Venetian preparations to leave became evident, many Athenians chose to leave, fearing Ottoman reprisals: 622 families, some 4,000–5,000 people, were evacuated by Venetian ships and settled as colonists in Argolis, Corinthia, Patras, and Aegean islands. Morosini decided to at least take back a few ancient monuments as spoils, but on 19 March the statues of Poseidon and the chariot of Nike fell down and smashed into pieces as they were being removed from the western pediment of the Parthenon. The Venetians abandoned the attempt to remove further sculptures from the temple, and instead took a few marble lions, including the famous Piraeus Lion, which had given the harbour its medieval name "Porto Leone", and which today stands at the entrance of the Venetian Arsenal. On 10 April, the Venetians evacuated Attica and returned to the Morea.

== Sources ==
- Chasiotis, Ioannis (1975). "Η κάμψη της Οθωμανικής δυνάμεως" [The decline of Ottoman power]. In Christopoulos, Georgios A. & Bastias, Ioannis K. (eds.). Ιστορία του Ελληνικού Έθνους [History of the Greek Nation] (in Greek). Vol. ΙΑ: Ο Ελληνισμός υπό ξένη κυριαρχία (περίοδος 1669 - 1821), Τουρκοκρατία - Λατινοκρατία [Hellenism under Foreign Rule (Period 1669 - 1821), Turkocracy – Latinocracy]. Athens: Ekdotiki Athinon. ISBN 978-960-213-100-8.
- Finlay, George (1877). A History of Greece from its Conquest by the Romans to the Present Time, B.C. 146 to A.D. 1864, Vol. V: Greece under Othoman and Venetian Domination A.D. 1453–1821. Oxford: Clarendon Press.
- Paton, James Morton (1940). The Venetians in Athens, 1687–1688, from the Istoria of Cristoforo Ivanovich. Gennadeion Monographs I. Cambridge, Massachusetts: Harvard University Press.
