= Manuscript Hamilton 254 =

c. 1440 manuscript

- Berlin State Library
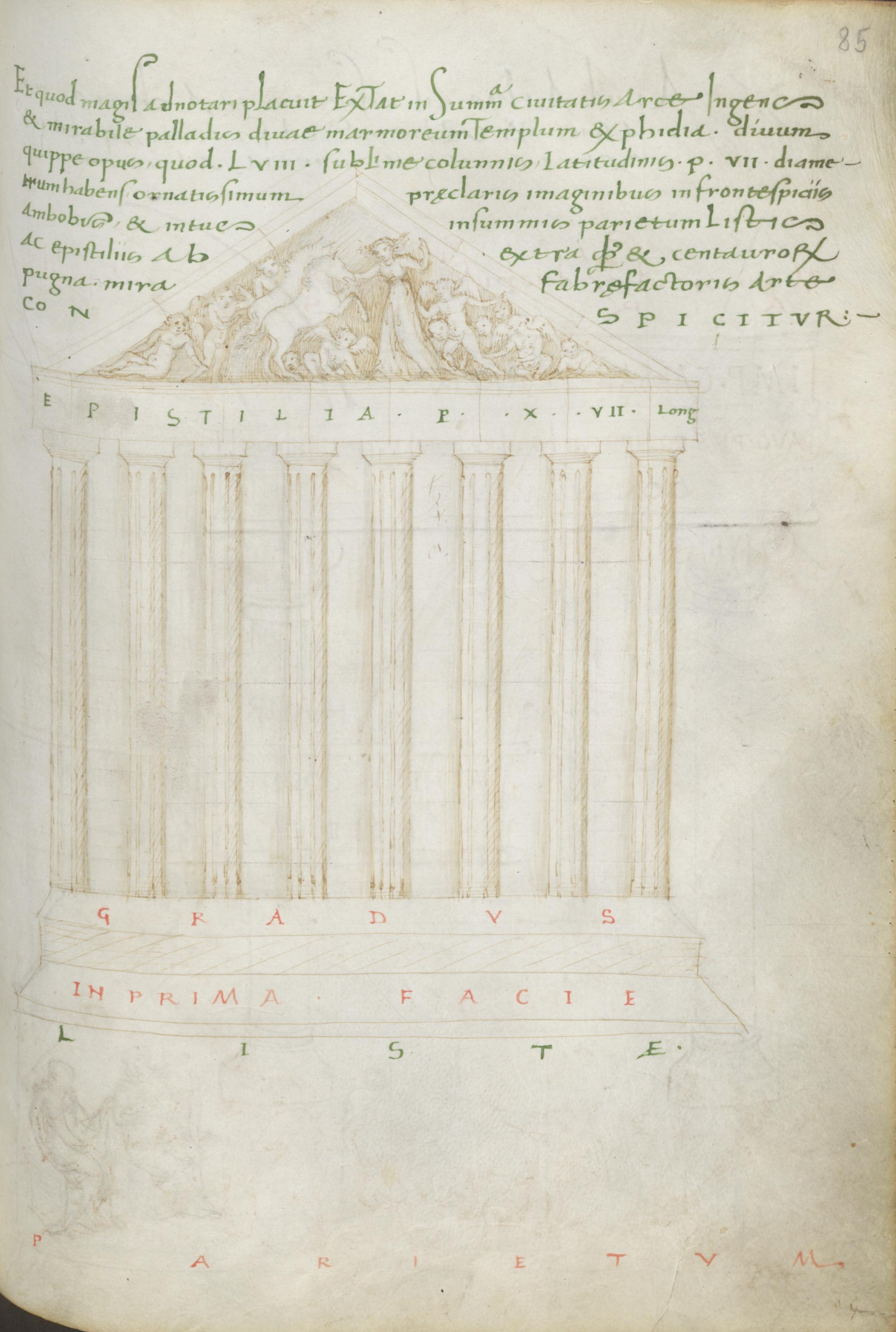
- The west façade of the Parthenon on folio 85r
- Also known as: Codex Hamilton 254
- Type: Humanist miscellany (collectanea)
- Date: c. 1440
- Place of origin: Northern Italy
- Language(s): Latin, with some Greek
- Material: vellum
- Size: II + 124 leaves (foliated 1–126)
- Contents: A collection of various texts, ancient inscriptions and drawings from various sources

The Manuscript Hamilton 254 (also known as Codex Hamilton 254) is a 15th-century manuscript compiled by the Venetian Renaissance humanist and bishop Pietro Donato. It contains a collection of various texts, ancient inscriptions and drawings from various sources (collectanea).

The volume is best known for a portfolio on folios 81r–90v personally written by the Italian antiquarian and traveller Cyriacus of Ancona, which includes the oldest extant drawing of the Parthenon as well as other drawings of Athenian monuments.

The manuscript is one of the earliest examples of inscription collecting in the Renaissance.

== Name and dimensions ==
=== Name ===
The manuscript's name relates to the Manuscripta Hamiltoniana (Ms. Ham.) collection of the Berlin State Library. Then the Royal Library, it purchased the collection of the Scottish politician Alexander Hamilton, 10th Duke of Hamilton, in 1882.

=== Dimensions ===
The quarto manuscript has II + 124 folios and measures 25 cm × 17 cm (9.8 in × 6.7 in) with 31 to 32 lines per page. Its vellum is of high quality.

== History ==
=== Origins ===
The German classical scholar Theodor Mommsen dated the manuscript from internal evidence in an 1883 publication: The manuscript mentions a church disputation held in Florence in 1439. It contains lists of Holy Roman emperors and popes which at first ended with Albert II and Eugene IV, with entries for the elections of Frederick III and Nicholas V added later. Mommsen concluded that the majority of the volume was written in 1439.

Helmut Boese, a German librarian, dates the volume to about 1440–1445 in the 1966 standard catalogue for the Latin manuscripts of the Manuscripta Hamiltoniana. Debra Pincus, an independent scholar, dated it in 2017 to 1442–1443.

=== Scribe ===
==== Pietro Donato ====
Mommsen has identified Pietro Donato, the bishop of Padua from 1428 to 1447, as the scribe of the volume. He linked it to Donato because its scribe records several inscriptions as standing in his garden or villa and the same stones are known to have stood in the garden of Donato. Mommsen further located Donato's partially erased name on folio 81v (Note: Mommsen reads "R D PETRO EPO [PA]T" in the beginning of the very first line of folio 81v.) and on a note on folio 121r where the "P." for Pietro is still visible. Mommsen concluded that at least the majority of the volume was handwritten by Donato himself.

Boese disagrees and only identifies entries or annotations on folios 50v, 81–90, 111v, 112r, 117r, 121v, 122r and 124v as handwritten by Donato. For the folios 81r to 90v, he identifies Cyriacus of Ancona, the 15th-century humanist, as their scribe. For the rest of the volume, he sees an unidentified person as the scribe, with the possibility of a second scribe for the folios 103r to 106v.

Boese further notes that the volume does not appear in a 1959 catalogue of Donato's library.

==== Cyriacus of Ancona ====
The writing on folios 81r–90v and an entry on folio 121v are done by the humanist Cyriacus of Ancona, who visited Athens in 1436. It is, however, uncertain if the drawings on these folios were also done by him personally. Adolf Michaelis, a German classical scholar, identified them in 1882 as done by Cyriacus personally. Boese considers it "not very convincing" that the drawings were not done by him, while Bernard Ashmole, the British archaeologist, holds this opinion. The art historians Beverly Louise Brown and Diana Kleiner noted in 1983 that scholarly opinion on this point is "now more or less divided" but consider Cyriacus's own hand to be more likely. Lillian Datchev, a historian of premodern Europe, stated in 2023 that the drawing of the Parthenon was indeed done by Cyriacus.

=== Later provenance ===
A partly erased ownership inscription of the latter half of the 15th century on folio 126r reads "Iste liber est mei Sacristearii(?) de Ferrarinis". In the first half of the 19th century the volume was rebound in England in red morocco by C. Meyer, with the spine title "EXCERPTA MSS", for the collection of the 10th Duke of Hamilton in whose library it bore the No. 102. The Hamilton manuscripts were purchased for Berlin in 1882. On arrival at the Royal Museums the codex carried the provisional No. 458 under the designation "Excerpta".

== Overview and reception ==
The contents of Donato's collectanea were described by Mommsen in 1883 and Boese in 1966. Mommsen has described the content of the manuscript in 1883 as an assortment of various texts – mostly of minor importance. It does, however, contain the epigraphic work of Cyriacus of Ancona and this work is considered valuable by Mommsen for the beginning of epigraphy, the study of inscriptions:

I know of no other [...] manuscript that has brought the beginnings of classical epigraphy [...] into such clear and striking view as these Collectanea by Pietro Donato, which were virtually unknown until a few weeks ago. No other major centre of modern civilisation has been the starting point for as many expeditions to collect inscriptions as Berlin; and if it is here [...] that the study of ancient epigraphy has found its centre, then perhaps we have earned the right [...] to rejoice that, alongside Rome, Berlin is now the only place where the autograph collections of the earliest epigraphic traveller, Cyriacus of Ancona, are preserved; [...].

— Theodor Mommsen

Writing in 2017, Pincus has praised the manuscript. She sees it as an "intriguing compendium" noting its inscriptions, the drawings of monuments and the letter forms:

[The manuscript] is one of the earliest pieces of evidence for inscription collecting in the Renaissance and [...] a model for later epigraphic collections. The volume has acquired a certain fame for its inclusion of a drawing of the Parthenon [...], but the manuscript needs to be celebrated as much – or even more – for its attention to letters, the letters of inscriptions and individual studies of antique Greek and Latin letters done freely in pen.

— Debra Pincus

== Content ==
=== Excerpts I (folios 3r–49v) ===
The volume begins with the following excerpts:

- A part of the Breviarium rerum gestarum populi Romani by Festus (folios 3r–8v).
- A notae list (a list of abbreviations) of Peter the Deacon (folios 9r–19r).
- A chronicle of the founding of Venice (folio 19r) with Cassiodorus's 537 letter on its origins (added in the lower margins of folios 18v–20r).
- Iuris notarum liber (a list of legal sigla) of Marcus Valerius Probus (folios 19v–20r).
- Fragments of the Twelve Tables (foundational Roman legislation) as transmitted by Gellius (folio 20v).
- Dig. 26,5,21–22 (Note: Book 26, Title 5, Paragraphs 21 and 22 (Modestinus)) (on the law of guardianship) in a Latin translation (folio 20v).
- Genealogical trees for the Catones (folio 21r) and Scipiones (folio 21v).
- The 963 bull of Leo VIII on the primacy of the Patriarchate of Aquileia (folios 22r–22v).
- A diploma of Carloman, the King of Bavaria (folios 23r–23v).
- A group of poems, inter alia, by Franciscus Fianus – among them his tituli for the frescoes of the Sala dei Giganti in the Palazzo Trinci at Foligno – and by Petrarch (folios 23v–26v).
- De aquaeductu (a report on the state of Roman aqueducts) by Frontinus (folios 27r–45r).
- A rudimentary map of the continents set within a wind rose (folio 45r).
- Excerpts from Saturnalia (book 3) by Macrobius (folio 46r).
- The pseudo-Plutarchan letter to Trajan from the lost Institutio Traiani (folio 47v).
- Letters of Caesar, which are part of Cicero's Epistulae ad Atticum (book IX) (folio 48r).
- Some verses from the Rosetum (Anthologia Latina No. 646) (folio 48v [top]).
- The epitaph of Isaac the Armenian (the exarch of Ravenna) in a Latin translation (Note: See Corpus Inscriptionum Graecarum 9869 for the Greek original.) (folio 48v [middle]).
- Another poem by Franciscus Fianus (folios 48v–49v).

=== Inscriptions I (folios 49v–80v) ===
The inscription collection on folios 49v–80v is named Epigramata litteris maiusculis scripta Latina et Greca et ut plurimum Romana in the manuscript's own table of contents. Theodor Mommsen checked them in 1883 against the Corpus Inscriptionum Latinarum (CIL) and Giovanni Battista de Rossi used them for his Inscriptiones Christianae urbis Romae. Notable inscriptions include:

- Tu qui secura procedis mente parumper (CIL VI 12652) (folios 64v/65r).
- The inscription on the so-called Tomb of Antenor (folio 76v).

=== Cyriacus's section (folios 81r–90v) ===
==== Writings and inscriptions ====
The folios 81r–90v contain, inter alia, Greek and Latin inscriptions collected by Cyriacus of Ancona during his first travels through Athens in April 1436. According to Michaelis they originally formed a stand-alone booklet consisting of five double-page spreads (Quinio). The writings contain, for example:

- The inscription on the Arch of Trajan in Ancona (CIL IX 5894) (folio 81r).
- A letter to Donato (folio 81v).
- Parts of the Palatine Anthology, a collection of Greek poems.
- Excerpts from Plutarch (Apophthegmata regum et imperatorum and De Alexandri fortuna).
- The names and signs of planets (folio 89v).
- Greek and Latin alphabets (folio 90v). These are praised by Pincus as "[an] honor [to] antique letter forms, making them available as models".

==== Drawings ====
Notably, the volume also contains some drawings of buildings or sculptures in Athens:

- The west façade of the Parthenon (folio 85r). This is the oldest extant drawing of the Parthenon. According to Mommsen it was a copy of Cyriacus's original drawing of the Parthenon of 6 April 1436, which was later lost. The drawing shows eight fluted Doric columns without bases. Brown and Kleiner point out that "the measurements of the intercolumniations and the proportions are hopelessly inaccurate", that the "triglyphs and metopes have been omitted" and that "the narrative of the pedimental sculpture" has been "transformed". They further note that "Poseidon is not shown and the remaining figures have been recast as winged genii". Samantha L. Martin-McAuliffe, an architect, and John K. Papadopoulos, an archeologist, remarked positively in 2012 on the drawing arguing that while it "contains many inaccuracies, it nevertheless stands as a document of tremendous significance". In 2025, Ioannis Mitsios, a Greek archeology scholar, commented less positively on its quality noting that it "differ[s] from reality and should be seen as [an] imaginary and amateurish depictio[n] of the west pediment, rather than [a] realistic attestatio[n]".
- The Arch of Hadrian (folio 85v).
- The Tower of the Winds (folio 87r). Next to the drawing is an excerpt of Vitruvius's De architectura (I.6.) on the winds as a marginal note.
- The Temple of Olympian Zeus (folio 87v).
- A giant (folio 88v). Specifically, the drawing shows a giant in front of the Odeon of Agrippa in the Ancient Agora of Athens, which Cyriacus misidentified as a female sea creature.
- The Choragic Monument of Lysicrates (folio 88v).
- A figure of Homer (folio 90r).
The Athens drawings of Manuscript Hamilton 254
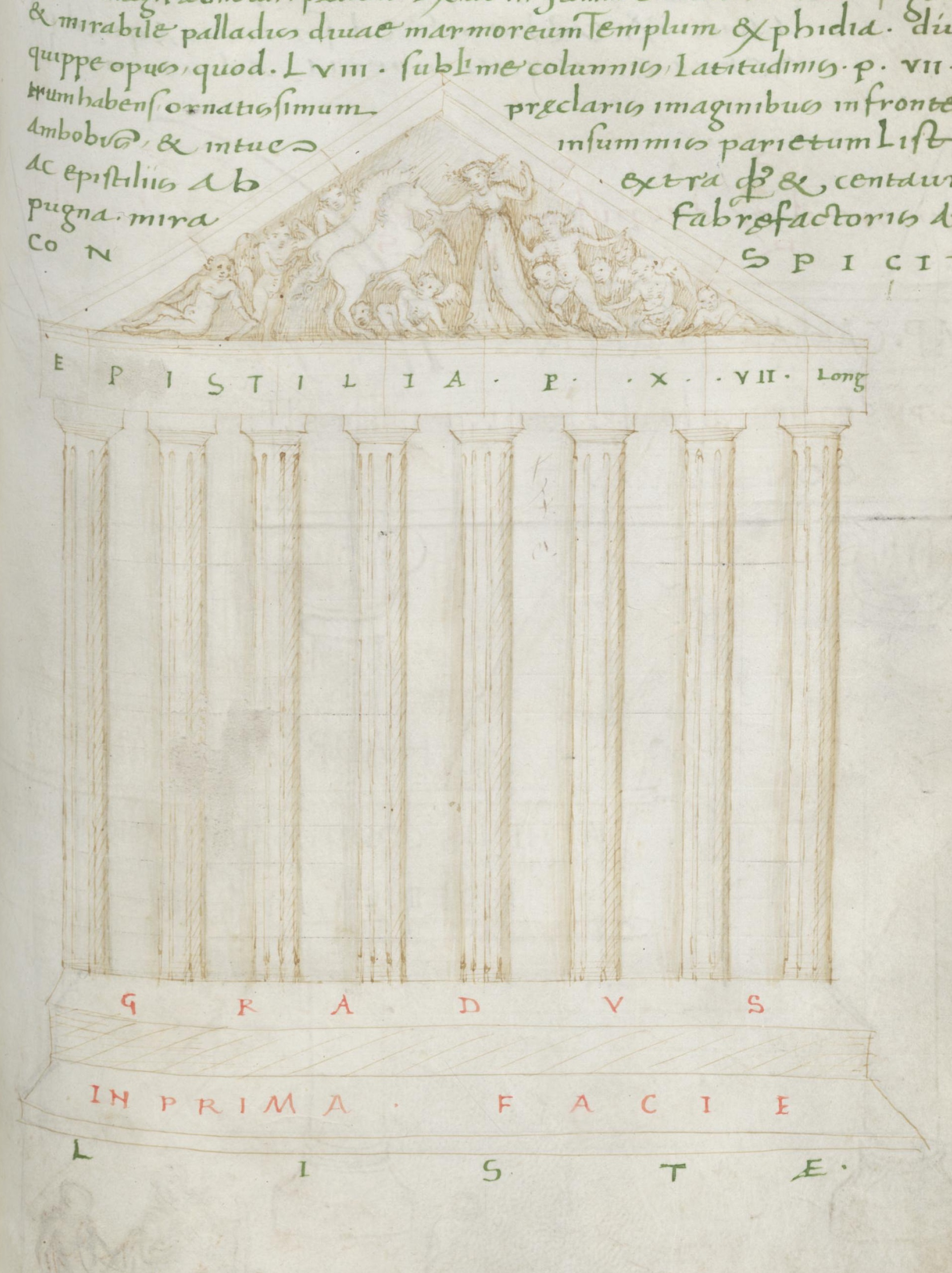
The west façade of the Parthenon (folio 85r)

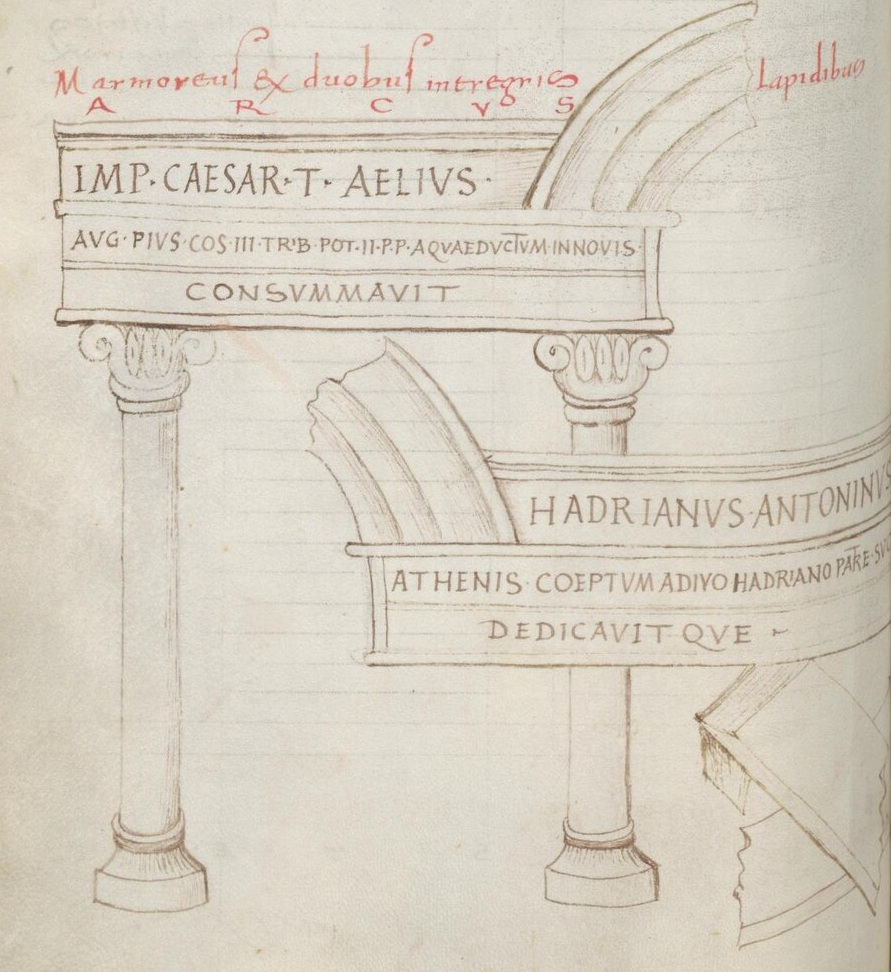
The Arch of Hadrian (folio 85v)

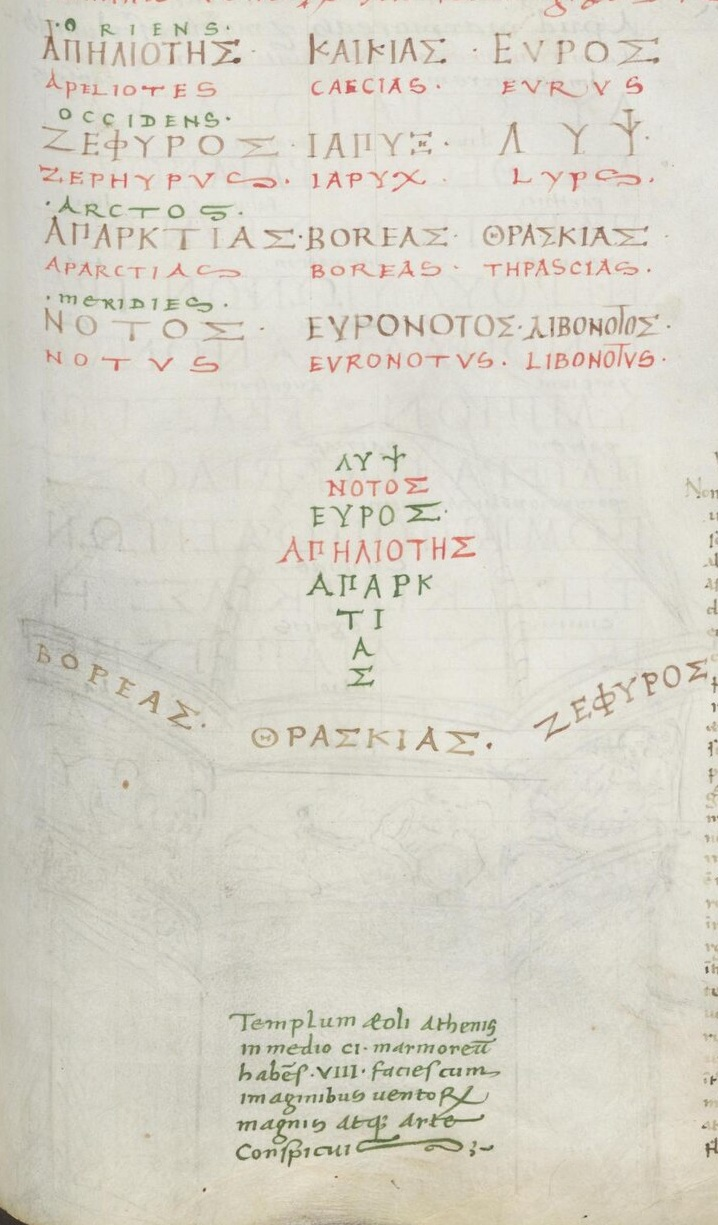
The Tower of the Winds (folio 87r)

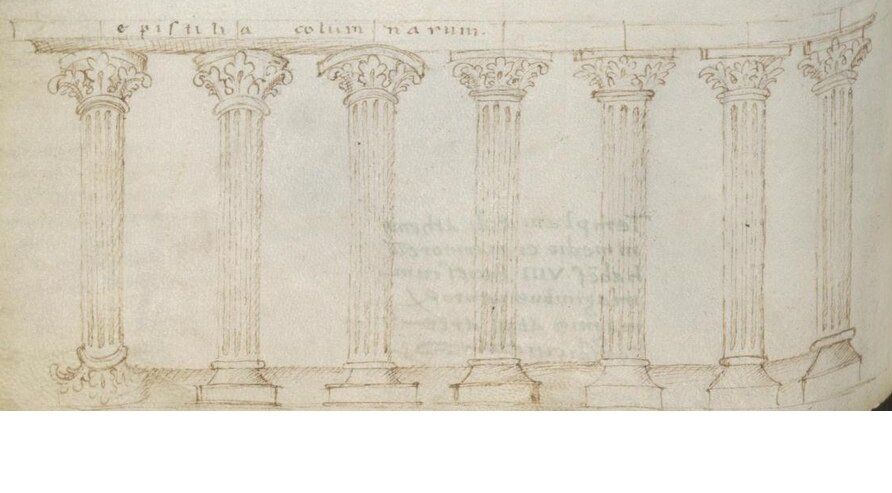
The Temple of Olympian Zeus (folio 87v)

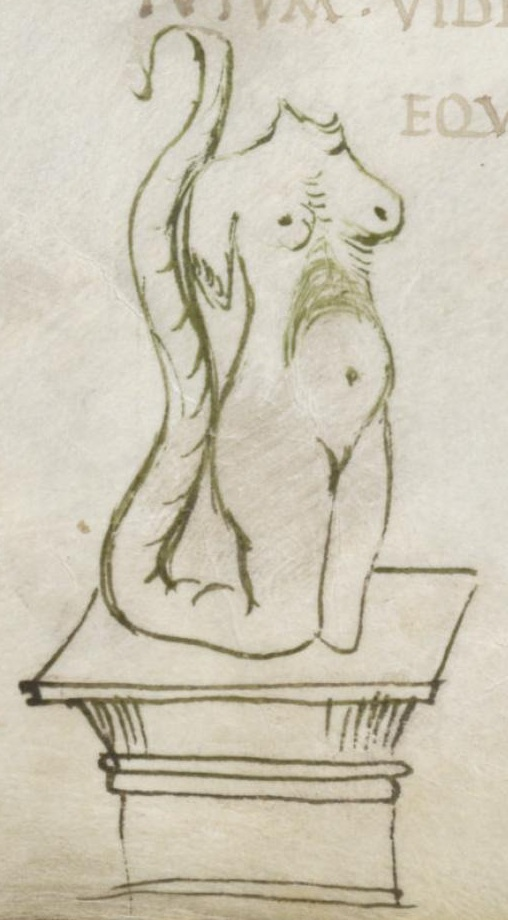
A giant in front of the Odeon of Agrippa (folio 88v)

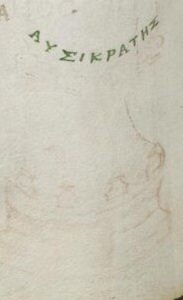
The Choragic Monument of Lysicrates (folio 88v)

=== Lists and excerpts II (folios 91r–111r) ===
The volume continues from folios 91r to 111r with lists and further excerpts:

- A list of Roman and Holy Roman Emperors from Caesar to Albert II, with the death of Albert II on 27 October 1439 and the election of Frederick III on 3 February 1440 (Note: The manuscript dates the election to 3 February 1440, while it actually took place on 2 February 1440.) added later (folios 91r–94r).
- A list of popes (211 counted) from Peter to Eugene IV, with the election and coronation of Nicholas V added later (folio 95r–101v).
- Imperial privileges for Donato's Diocese of Padua. Possibly done by another scribe and not in chronological order:
  - Henry III: 16 April 1049 (Monumenta Germaniae Historica [MGH] DD H. III. No. 234). This manuscript was used as witness D in the MGH (folios 103r).
  - Henry IV: 26 June 1090 (MGH DD H. IV. No. 414). This manuscript was not used for MGH (folios 103v–104r).
  - Henry IV: 23 July 1079 (MGH DD H. IV. No. 312). This manuscript was used as witness D for MGH (folios 104v–105r).
- The 817 Pactum Hludowicianum, a treaty between the Papal States and the Carolingian Empire (folios 105v–106v).
- The Donation of Constantine, a (forged) imperial Roman decree in a Latin re-translation (folios 107r–108r).
- A calendar for January to June following the Fasti poem of Ovid (folios 108v–111r).

=== Inscriptions II (folios 111v–118r) ===
On folios 111v–118r the inscription collection continues. Within this section the following poem is written:

- The poem Septem sapientum sententiae of pseudo-Ausonius (folios 117r–117v).

=== Excerpts III and inscriptions III (folios 118v–125r) ===
The volume continues with further excerpts and inscriptions:

- Epitaphs for Seneca (apocryphal), the wife of Boethius (apocryphal), Ovid, Dante and Giovanni Visconti (folios 118v–119r).
- Excerpts from Cicero's De legibus (book 2,19–23 and book 3,5–12) (folios 119v–120r).
- A catalogue of Greek authors arranged by genre with an appended list of five "eloquent Roman women" which also appears in Ms. Turin, Biblioteca Nazionale Universitaria, J.IV.7. on folios 186 et seq. (folios 120v–121r).
- Further inscriptions by Donato and Cyriacus (folios 121v–122r).
- An excerpt from Appian's Mithridatica on the triumph of Pompey in the Mithridatic Wars in a Latin translation distinct from that of Pietro Candido Decembrio (folio 122r).
- A letter dated 18 November 1439 from a person named Lutius. In it, Lutius claims to be incarcerated and to have written the calendar on folios 108v–111r, which he presents to Donato with this letter (folio 124r–124v).
- A list of schisms whose added notice of Eugene IV's deposition by the Council of Basel was partly erased later (folios 125r).

== See also ==
- Hamilton Bible
- Hamilton Psalter
- MS Ham. 78.A.5
