= Pediments of the Parthenon =

Statues on the Acropolis in Athens, Greece

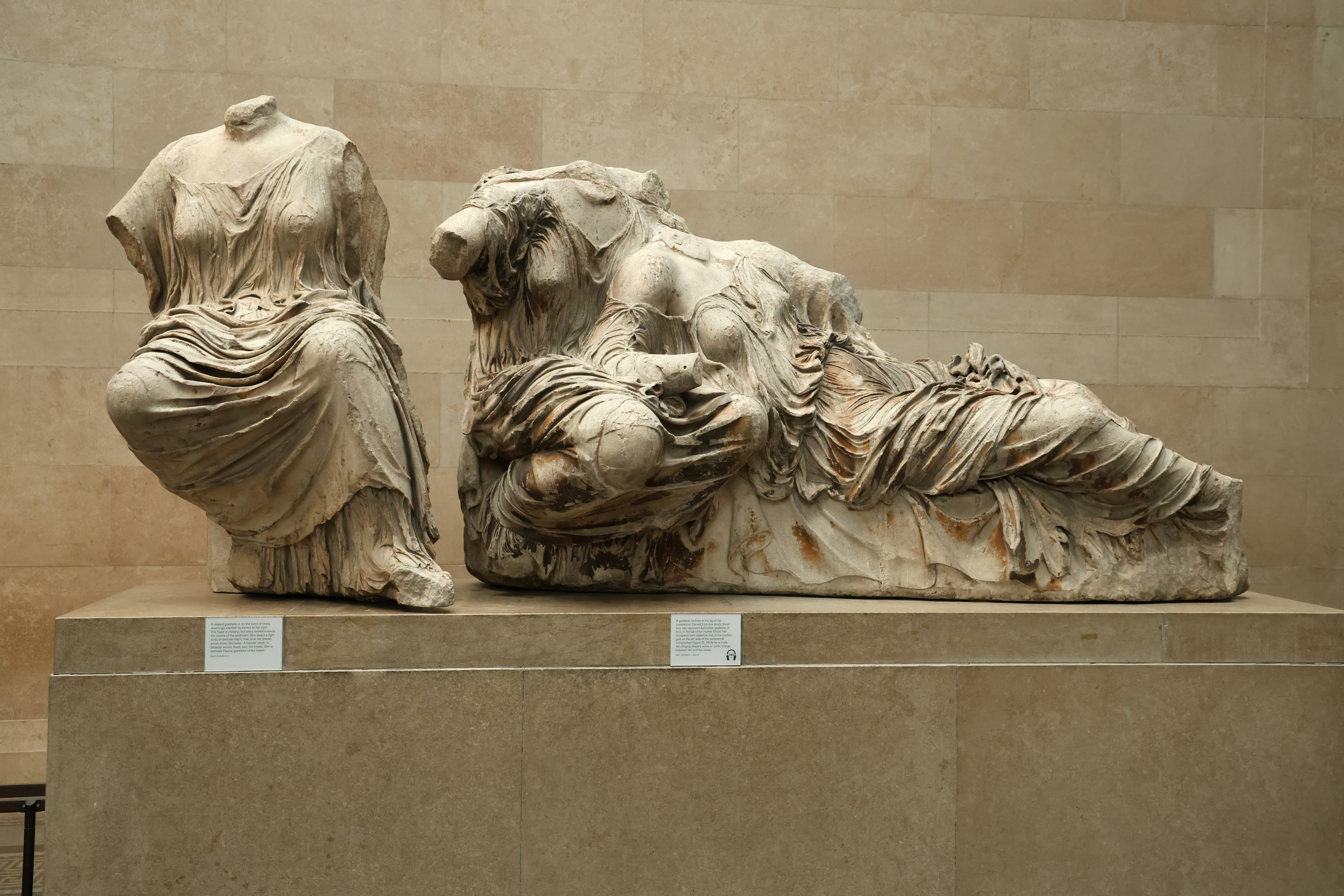
Female marble statues, east pediment.

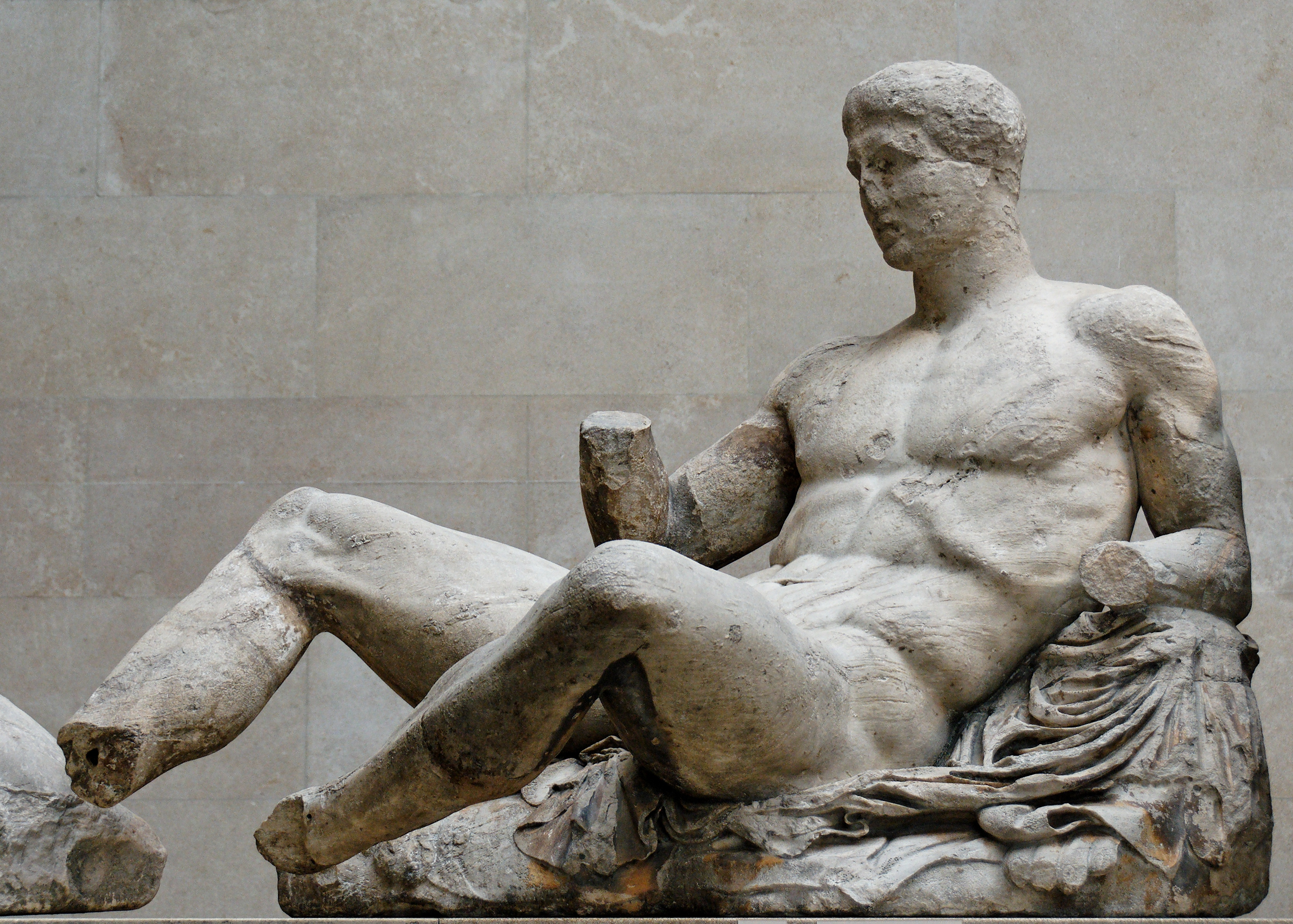
Statue of Dionysus, east pediment.

The pediments of the Parthenon are the two sets of statues (around fifty) in Pentelic marble originally located as the pedimental sculpture on the east and west facades of the Parthenon on the Acropolis of Athens. They were probably made by several artists, including Agoracritos. The master builder was probably Phidias. They were probably lifted into place by 432 BC, having been carved on the ground.

Pausanias, a Greek geographer, described their subjects: to the east, the birth of Athena, and to the west the quarrel between her and Poseidon to become the tutelary deity of Athens.

The pediments have been damaged multiple times by natural disasters, fire, religious conflicts, weathering and pollution. As the temple was in use for almost 1000 years, we must assume that some of the figures were repaired, modified or completely replaced during this phase.

Considered the archetype of classical sculpture, or even the embodiment of ideal beauty, several of the statues were removed from the building by Lord Elgin's agents in the early nineteenth century and transported to the British Museum in London. Some statues and many fragments are kept at the Acropolis Museum in Athens. Other groups of sculpture, both reliefs at a smaller scale, from the Parthenon are the Metopes of the Parthenon and the Parthenon Frieze.

== Construction ==
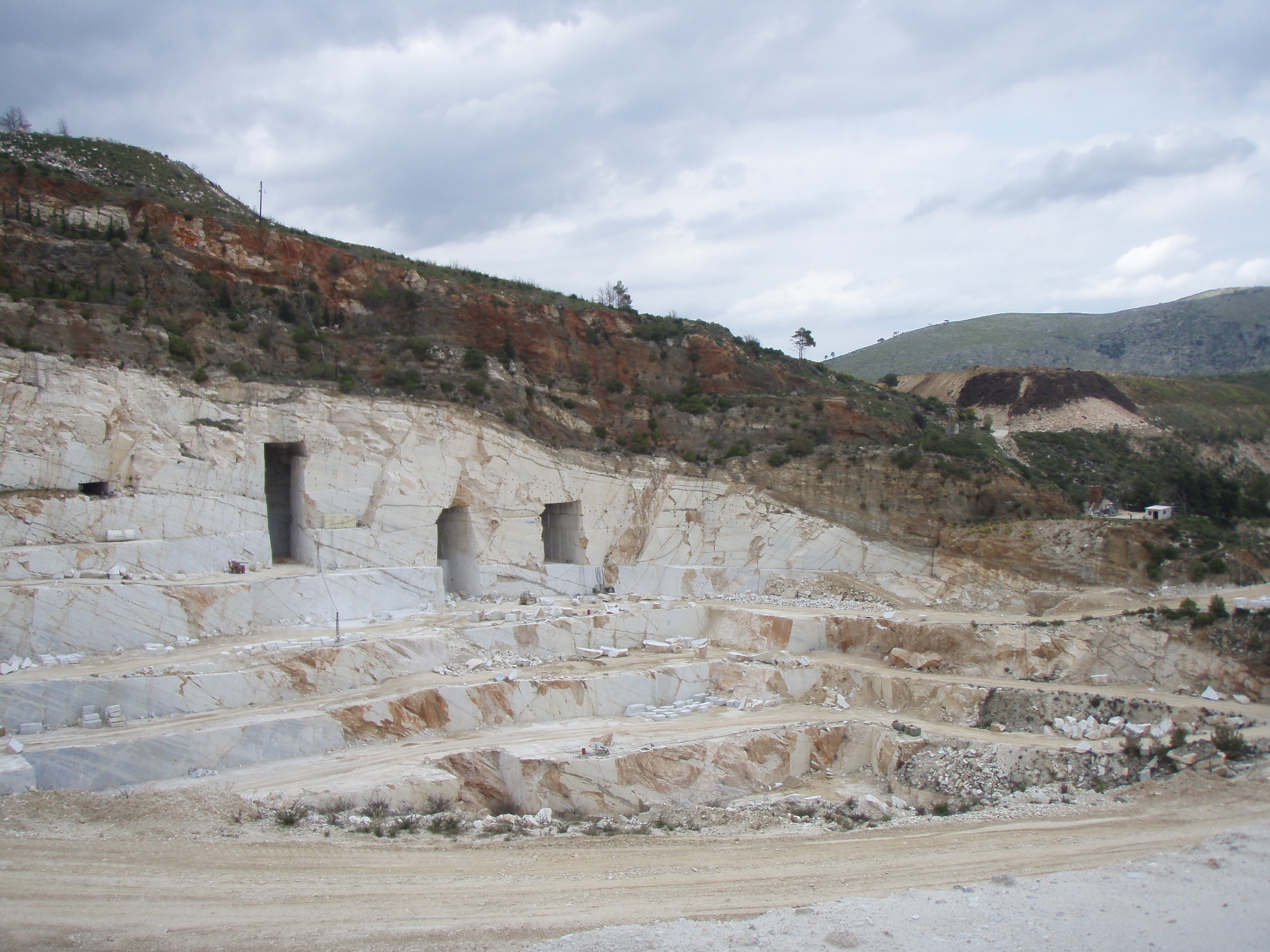
A modern quarry on Mt. Pentelikon.

The accounts of the construction of the Parthenon make it possible to know that the marble intended for the pediments began to be extracted from the quarries of Mount Pentelikon in 439–438 BC.; sculpture work starting the following year. The accounts also show that excavation and transportation expenses were annual. This could mean that different quarries would have been used each year to obtain the highest possible quality marble. The last marble purchases in the quarries are recorded in 434 BC. In the logic of the construction of the building, the sculptures of the pediments had to be installed almost at the very end (before the installation of the roof), probably in 432 BC.

Since Adolf Michaelis in 1871, the statues are designated from left to right by a letter: from A to W for the western pediment and from A to P for the eastern pediment.

Pausanias regularly informs about the authors of the works he describes. (Note: He thus attributes the pediments of the temple of Zeus at Olympia to Alcamenes pupil of Phidias those of the temple of Heracles at Thebes to Praxiteles or those of the temple of Apollo at Delphi to Praxias and Androsthenes.) However, he gives no information on the "author" of the Parthenon pediments. A master builder for each of the pediments may even be possible. Due to the size of the construction site (about fifty carved statues in half a dozen years), many artists must have worked there, as the differences of style and techniques show. Thus, the western pediment seems more refined, more "artificial" (almost mannerist) than the eastern pediment. It is possible that there was one artist per statue or group of statues. The accounts of 434–433 indicate that the sculptors were paid 16,392 drachmas. It is difficult to know, however, whether this is the total wage or the salary for that year alone. For comparison, the total cost of each of the (much smaller) pediments of Asclepius Temple in Epidaurus was 3,010 drachmas. Robert Spenser Stanier proposed in 1953 an estimate of 17 talents for pediments and acroterions.

Annotated sectional view of the Parthenon with parts in the British Museum shaded

The statues are the largest pediment statues made in classical Greece and they are almost all in one piece. In addition, they were sculpted in the round. The same care was accorded to the front and the back, though the latter is hidden. It is possible that they were "exposed" on the site while waiting to be mounted on the Parthenon. The artists would then have chosen to finish them in their entirety. Nevertheless, the finish depends on the statues, and therefore the sculptors. On some, details, invisible from the ground were left unfinished, while on others, this was not the case. In addition, it was necessary to plane the back of some (west A for example) to make them fit their designated place.

Deep rectangular grooves at the corners of pediments could indicate the presence in these places of a lift-type mechanism for mounting statues.

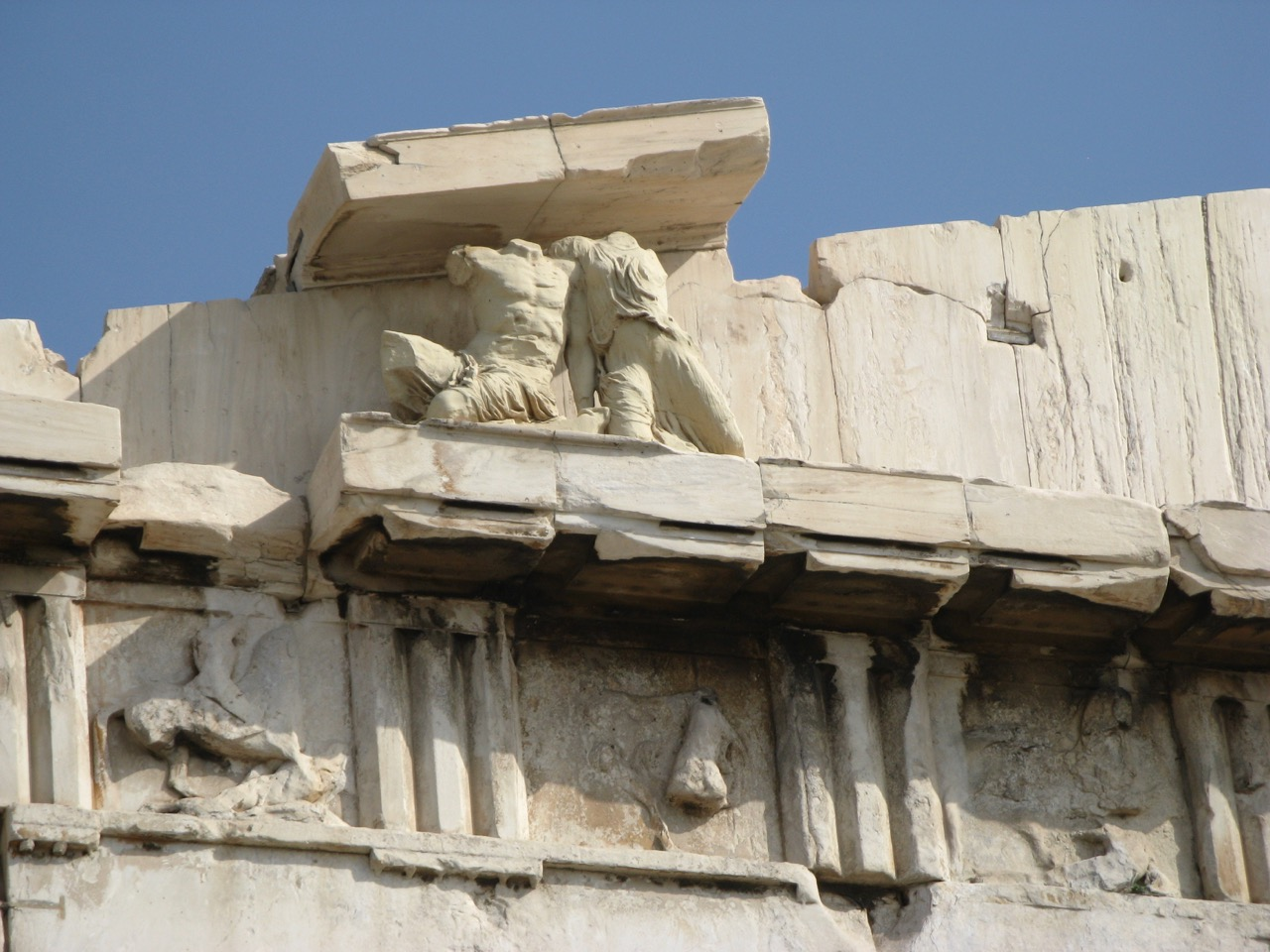
Triglyphs and metopes on the west pediment

Above the Doric frieze (triglyphs and metopes) was an overhanging horizontal cornice of twenty-five blocks of marble. The ranking cornices were surmounted by a painted sima (palmettes and golden lotus flowers). Thus, was delimited a long space of 28.35 m and high (in its center) of 3.428 m or 3.47 m to a depth of 0.90 m. All the statues were installed on the horizontal cornice which exceeded in overhanging of 70 cm, placed either on a plinth or on a laying bed. To install the statue is G, the cornice had to be dug out.

The pediments of the Temple of Zeus at Olympia, about twenty years older, and seem to have been a major influence for the realization of the pediments of the Parthenon. The dimensions are relatively equivalent: 3.44 meters high to a depth of 1 meter at Olympia. In order to make them more visible, because of the angle of vision, some of the statues were inclined outwards, as in Olympia, and sometimes up to 30 cm above the void. Even the sitting statues had their feet protruding from the edge. The fixing systems (dowels and spikes) of the statues at the horizontal cornice were nearly the same in Athens and Olympia. However, for the heaviest (in the center), the Parthenon sculptors had to innovate. They were held by iron props that sank to one side in the plinth of the statue and the other deep in the horizontal cornice and tympanum. These "L" props made the weight of the statue cantilevered on the cornice.

== Description ==
The pediments of the Parthenon included many statues. The one to the west had a little more than the one to the east. In the description of the Acropolis of Athens by Pausanias, a sentence informs about the chosen themes: the quarrel between Athena and Poseidon for Attica in the west and the birth of Athena in the east. This is the only evocation in the ancient literature of the Parthenon's decoration. In addition, the traveler gives no detail outside the general theme while he describes in a very precise way the pediments of the temple of Zeus in Olympia. Perhaps he considered the Panhellenic sanctuary of the Peloponnese to be more important than the Parthenon, the latter perhaps being too "local", or simply Athenian.

The number of statues and the very precise myths evoked makes Bernard Ashmole wonder if the contemporaries themselves were really capable of identifying all the characters.

=== West Pediment ===
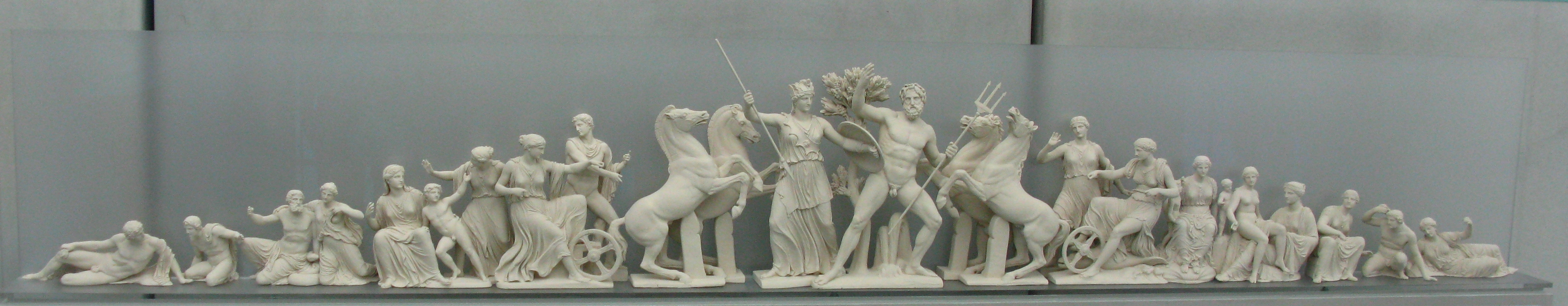
Proposed reconstruction of the west pediment at the Acropolis Museum, Athens.

To the west, on the "minor" facade, was the quarrel between Athena and Poseidon for Athens and Attica and the victory of the Virgin Goddess, one of the great local myths. The two divinities disputed sovereignty over the region. They decided to offer the most beautiful gifts to win. With one blow of his trident, the god of the seas caused a spring (or a lake) of salty water to spring up on the acropolis. The virgin goddess with a spearhead made the first olive tree appear. The sources do not agree on the identity of the referees. They chose Athena and her olive tree. This story is first recounted by Herodotus (VIII, 55). This myth had hitherto been little represented: the artist who conceived the ensemble, as well as the sculptors, had a complete freedom.

In the central space, the two gods (Athena on the left, West L, Poseidon on the right, West M) were perhaps separated by the olive tree of Athena or even the lightning of Zeus. The representation on this pediment of an intervention of Zeus in the quarrel could be the first occurrence of this theme. It is then found on a vase from the end of the fifth century BC. preserved in the archaeological museum of Pella and in literature.

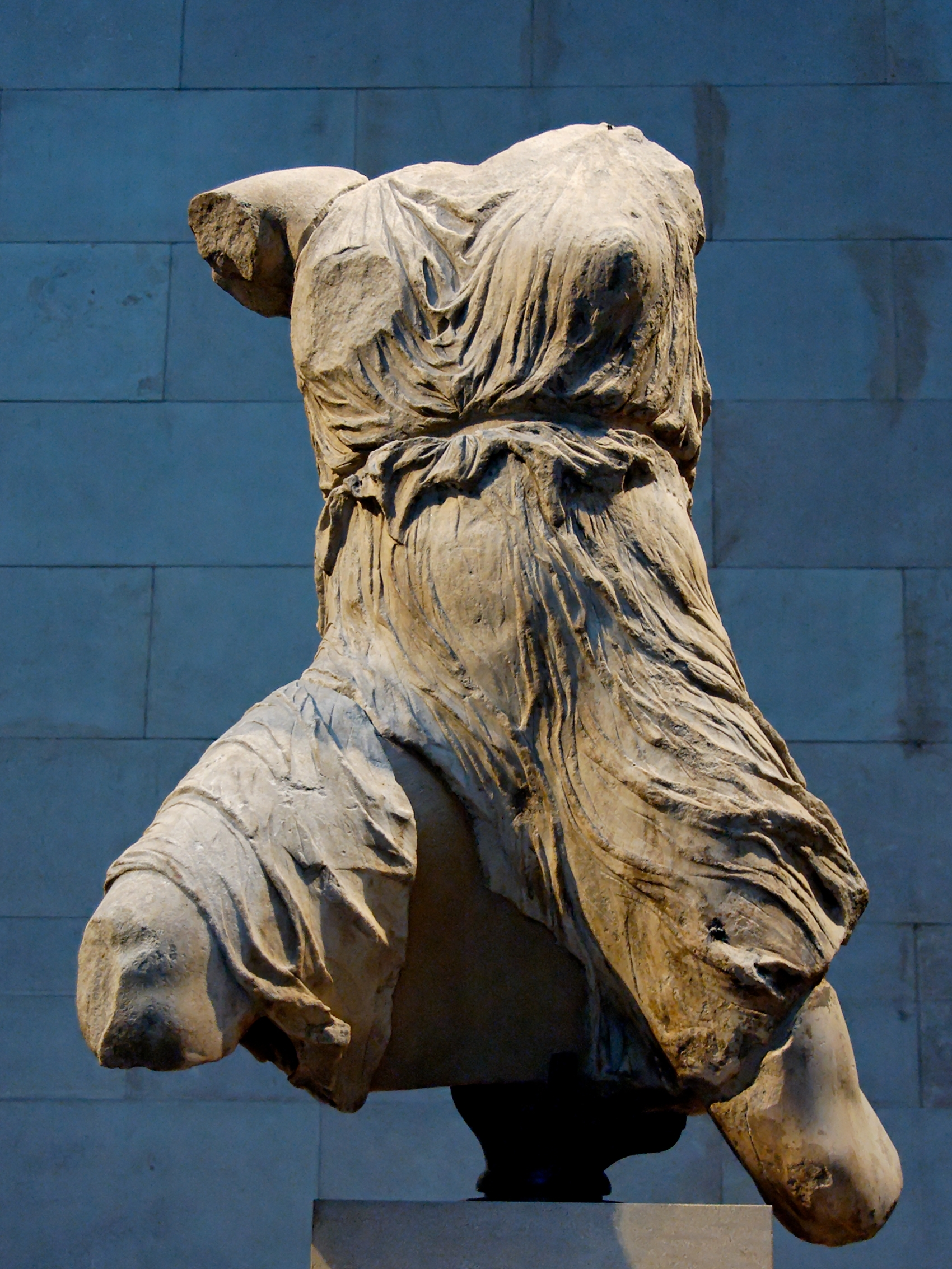
Iris (west N).

It is difficult to determine where the gift of the two gods could be represented: emerging from the ground at the end of their weapon (lance for Athena and trident for Poseidon) or the olive tree well in the center of the pediment, with the sacred serpent of Athena wrapped around. It seems that Poseidon's torso was used as a model for the Triton that adorn the Odeon of Agrippa in the ancient agora. The violence of the divine confrontation can be read in the tension of the tense bodies which are recoiling backward, as in the famous group Athena and Marsyas of Myron, dedicated on the acropolis a few years earlier. The movement also recalls that of the South metope XXVII.

Then came the chariots (biga) and their female charioteers. Nike (west G) leads that of Athena, but the statue has completely disappeared. Amphitrite (west O) is the usual charioteer of the sea god: on the drawing attributed to Carrey, she is identifiable thanks to the sea serpent at her feet, (Note: Fragments of this snake were found and identified in the 1980s: they are kept at the Acropolis Museum in Athens.(Cook 1984, pp. 42–43)) but she is found occupying this function elsewhere in the art and perhaps is on one of the east metopes. Amphitrite wears a peplos with a wide belt worn very high, just under the chest. The garment is open on the left side, floating behind in the wind, leaving the leg bare. The rearing horses allow an ideal occupation of the space between the cornices. The auriga is accompanied by the messenger gods: Hermes (west H) on the side of Athena and Nike; Iris (west N) of the other.

The head of Hermes disappeared between 1674 (drawing attributed to Carrey) and 1749 (drawing of Richard Dalton: he looked no longer the quarrel?, but already behind him. The bust of Iris was identified through the square holes at the shoulder blades, where her wings were originally attached. She wears a short tunic that the wind sticks to the forms of her body that can be divined in multiple folds. The tunic was retained by a thin belt, added in bronze and since lost.

After this large central group, the tension drops and the poses of the statues are calmer.

On the left side were various characters from the Attic mythology whose identifications are discussed. The general theme of the pediment being a purely local myth, it is often surmised that Athenian heroes should be represented. The western figures D, E and F have disappeared. The west group B and C is very damaged. Snake fragments (a snake or the tail of the male figure) suggest that it could be Cecrops and his daughter Pandrosus.

On the right side, two seated women carry children: west Q holds two babies (west P and R), it could be Orithyia the daughter of Erechtheus, carrying the two sons she had of Boreas, Calais and Zetes. West T has an older child on the knees (west S). The western U and V statues are highly damaged and fragmentary but do not appear to form a group.

The first figure on the left, male, (west A) and the last on the right, female, (west W) are symmetrical. By analogy with the pediments of Olympia, river deities have been identified: Ilissos or Cephis on the left and perhaps Callirrhoe on the right. The statue of the Ilissos is of very high quality in its rendering of the anatomical details and in its movement: it seems to be extracted from the ground while turning towards the central scene.

The composition of this pediment is inspired by that of the eastern pediment of Olympia. The idea of simple "spectator" statues sitting on the exteriors and then of river gods was also borrowed from the sanctuary in the Peloponnese. The western statues B, C, L, Q and perhaps W have been copied and adapted to adorn one of the pediments of the temple of Eleusis (smaller than that of the Parthenon), completed in the second century and representing the abduction of Persephone.

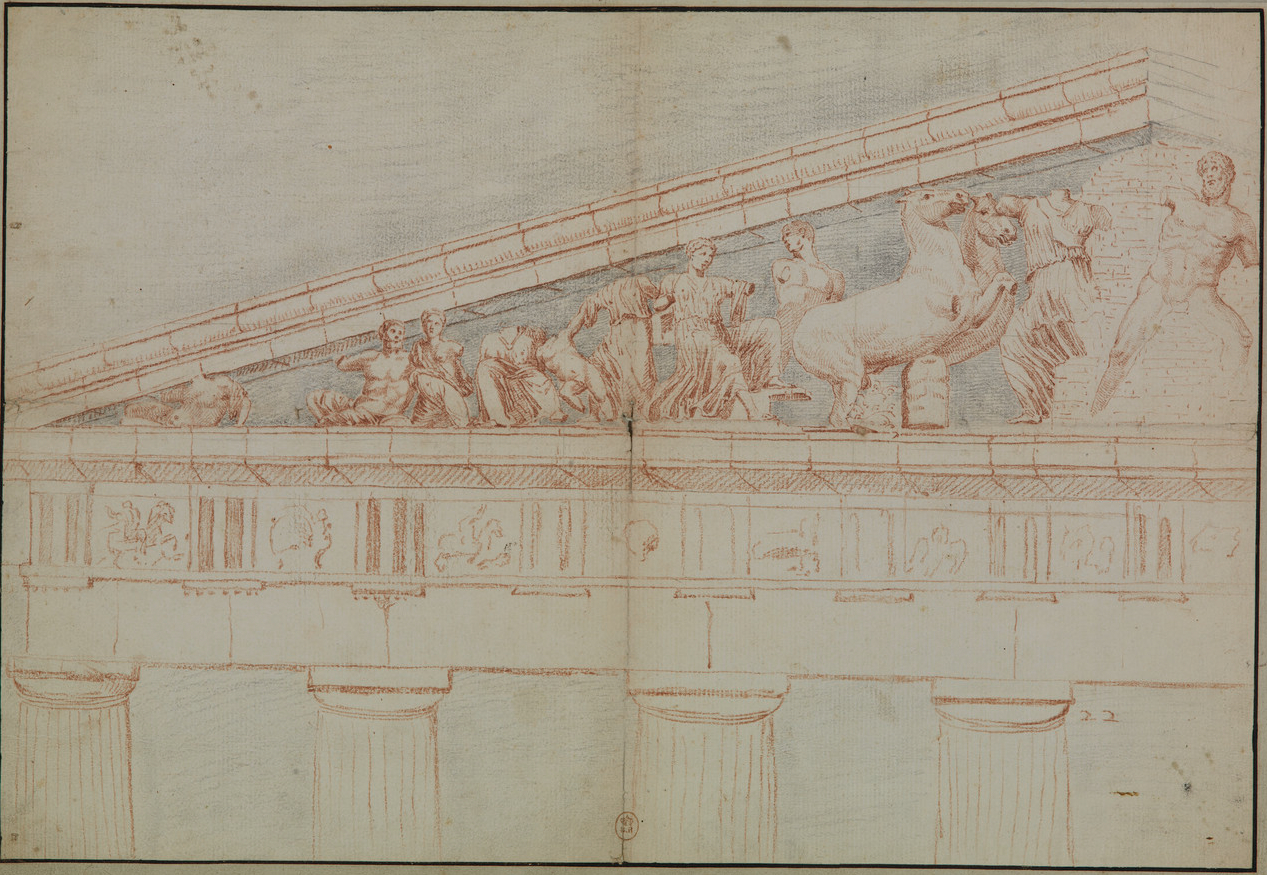
Drawing attributed to Jacques Carrey : west pediment, north part.

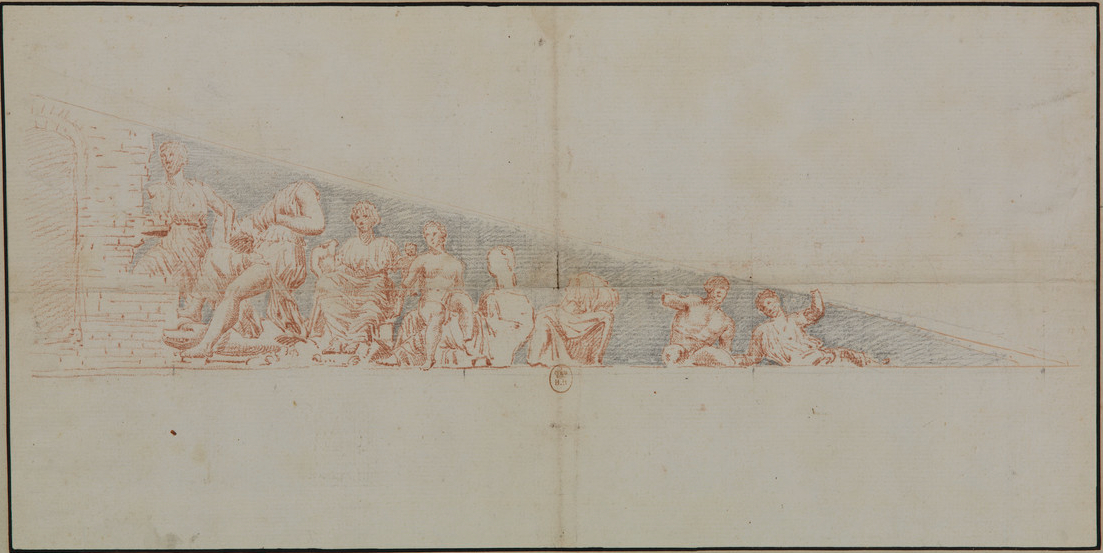
Drawing attributed to Jacques Carrey : west pediment, south part.

=== East Pediment ===
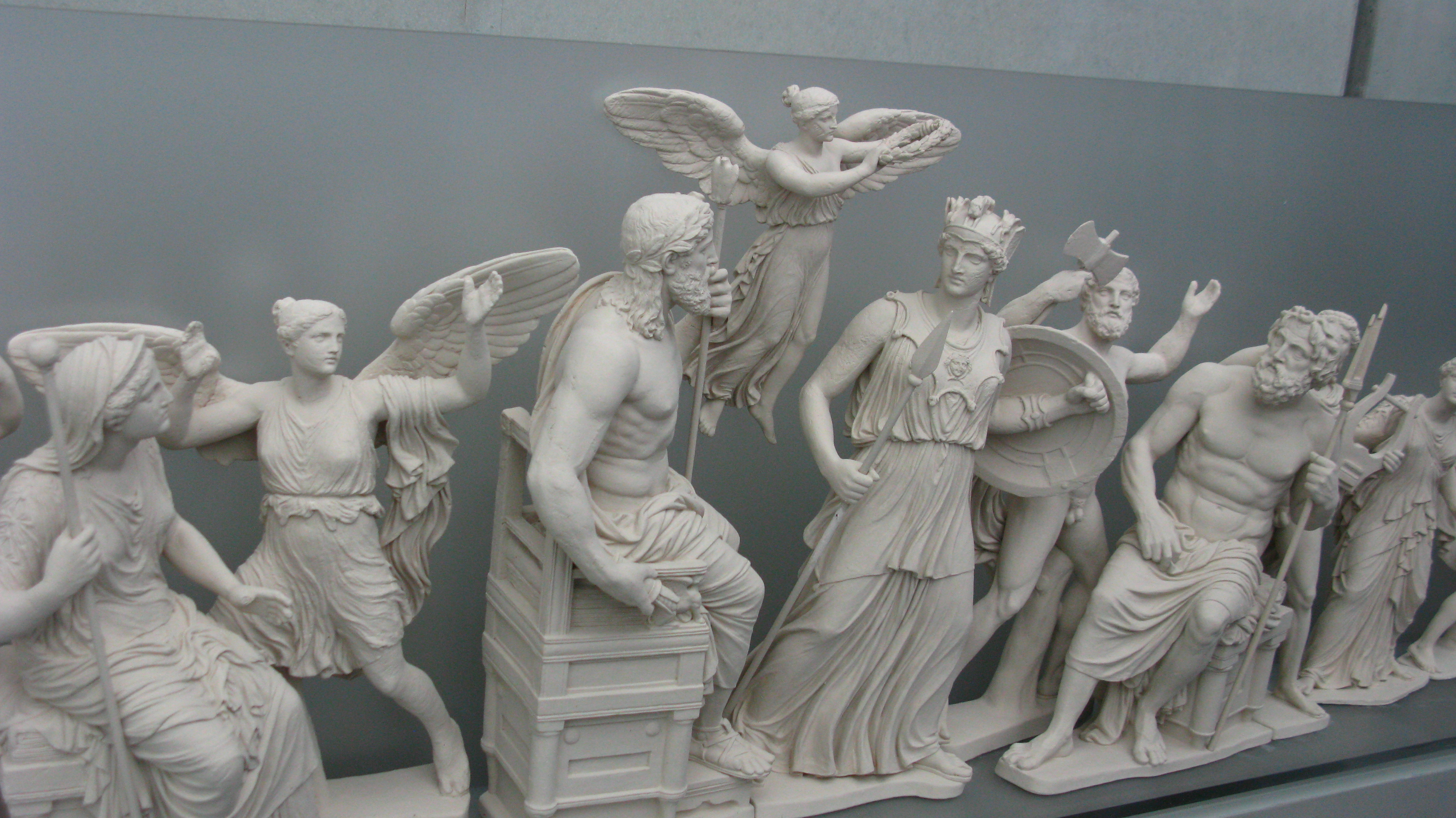
Proposed reconstruction of the east pediment in the Acropolis Museum, Athens.

The east pediment, on the most sacred facade, evokes the birth of Athena before the other gods together, a theme already developed in the decor of ceramics, but never yet in sculpture. However, we know little about it because it disappeared very early, when the Parthenon was transformed into a church in the seventh or eighth century.

In the center was enthroned Zeus, probably seated, his eagle at his feet. In fact, there remain traces of three large metal supports of a very heavy statue: Zeus was then seated, either on his throne or on a rock at the top of Olympus. Near him were to be Athena, of course, but also Hera and obviously Hephaestus or Prometheus and Ilithyia. Other statues are poorly identified. Various fragments preserved in the museum of the Acropolis of Athens certainly come from this pediment. The "Wegner peplophoros" (consisting of the fragments MAcr 6711 and MAcr 6712) could have been Hera. Similarly, the torso fragment MAcr 880 could correspond to the figure is H and may have been Hephaestus or one of the Dioscuri. Further, on each side, new grooves for retaining blades suggest again a very heavy statue, perhaps a biga, even if the presence of chariots here has no narrative justification; moreover, chariots (of gods) are present at the corners. These Heavy statues might be the horses of the Dioscuri, as proposed by Brinkmann and Koch-Brinkmann. In addition, the decor of a Roman well of the first century (Putéal de la Moncloa) preserved in the National Archaeological Museum of Spain evokes the presence of Moirai. As it seems to owe much to the Parthenon pediment, these deities could also attend the birth of Athena.

Outside the central action, the other deities on the pediment seem to make only the "act of presence." The left end, on the south, is the best-preserved. A standing female figure (designated G) walks away from the central action she is looking at. She is dressed in a peplos and approaches two other female figures (east E and F), sitting on folded cloths placed on chests (detail only visible from behind). The proposed interpretation is that it would be Demeter and her daughter Kore. To their left and with his back to them, a male figure (east D) is lying on a rock. This might be Dionysus or a deity indicating the locality. He is very athletic and has his legs apart. If this is the young Dionysus, who is also on the east side of the frieze, it may well be the first example of the change in the representation of this god. While he was previously portrayed in the guise of a rude old man, this youthful and turbulent version was then imposed on iconography. The god seems to salute the chariot of Helios rising from the end of the pediment.

The right end, to the north, has retained only a group of three women (east K, L and M). The work of the sculptors is of very high quality, mainly in the play of drapery. It is most often attributed to Agoracritus. East K is from the front. East M is carelessly lying on her neighbor east L. The trio has not been identified. However, the pattern of the chiton slipping subtly revealing the shoulder is seen here on east K and M. It is also on west C, identified with Pandrosus and the representation of Artemis on the eastern frieze. This sensual gesture could also be attributed to Aphrodite. Brinkmann and Koch-Brinkmann argue that east K, L and M show two Horai and the locality of Attika, which was usually called Attike. At the very end, the chariot of the Moon or Night seems to descend through the bottom of the pediment.

The myth of the birth of Athena, reported to compose the East pediment by Pausanias, is repeated also in the East pediment of the contemporary Attic temple nearby of the Hephaisteion.

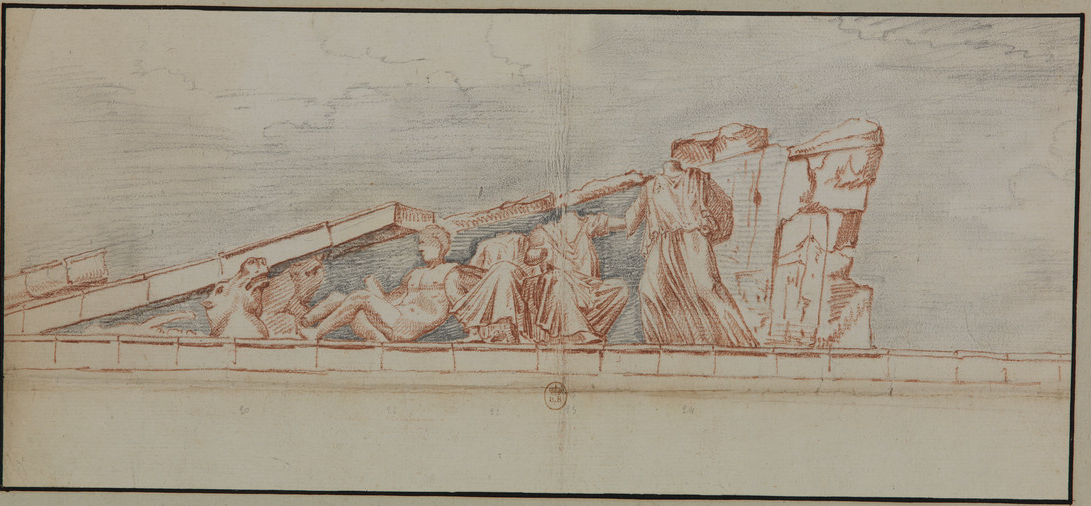
Drawing attributed to Jacques Carrey : east pediment, south part.

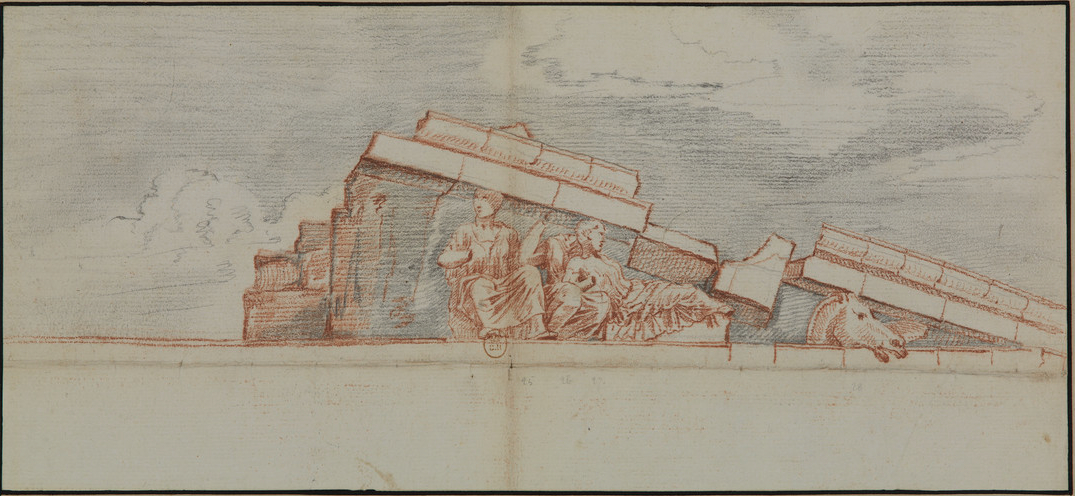
Drawing attributed to Jacques Carrey : east pediment, north part.

== History ==
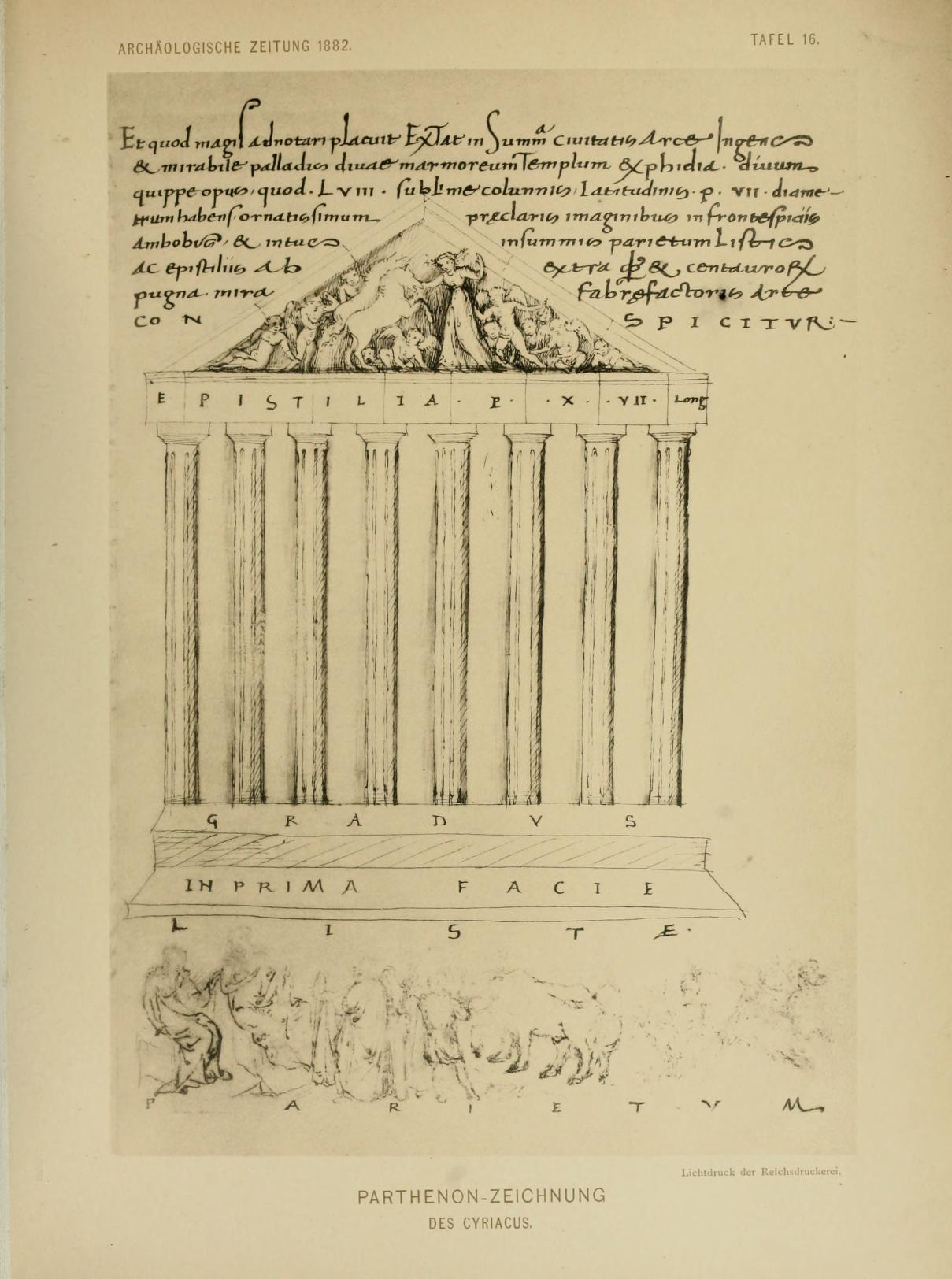
The west pediment as drawn by Cyriacus of Ancona in 1436, not very accurately (Manuscript Hamilton 254, folio 85r).

Block 19 of the eastern pediment's horizontal cornice was damaged and repaired in Roman times, but there is no evidence of restoration work on a statue. At the time of the transformation of the Parthenon into a church, somewhere in the sixth or the seventh century, the statues of the center of the eastern pediment were removed to make way for the apse.

In the first half of the fifteenth century, Cyriac d'Ancona during one of his visits to Athens drew one of the pediments, probably that of the west. He represents only a carriage, probably that of Athena: that of Poseidon would have already disappeared, without his fate being known. In 1674, an artist in the service of the Marquis de Nointel (French ambassador to the Sublime Porte), very probably Jacques Carrey, made fairly accurate coloured drawings of both pediments. In these, the west pediment already lacked the chariot of the god of the seas and a few heads, including that of Athena. The pediment was already very damaged.

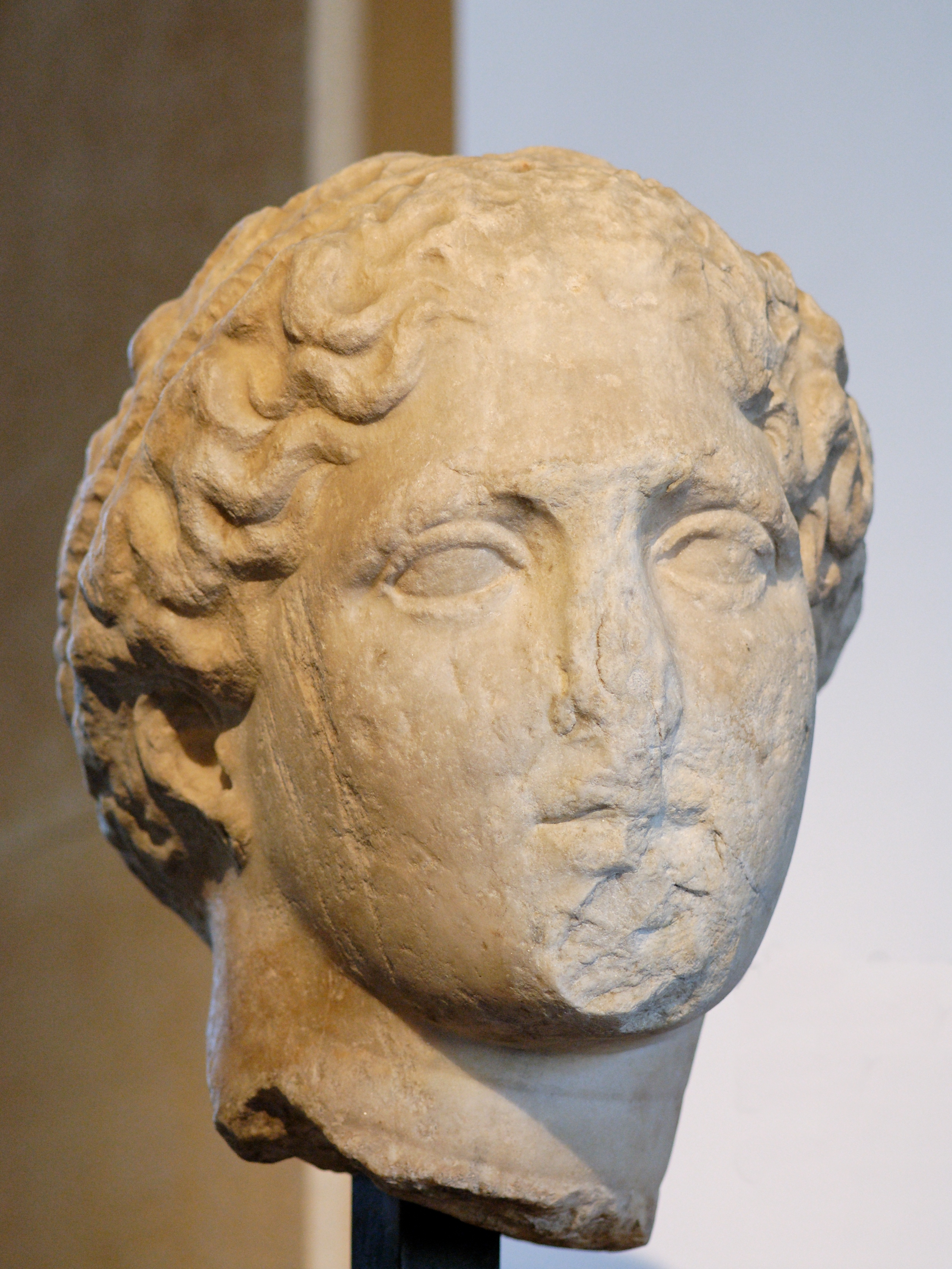
So-called "Weber-Laborde head", West pediment, ca. 447–433 BC; Louvre

On 26 September 1687, during the siege of Athens by the Venetians commanded by Francesco Morosini, the explosion of the powder reserve installed in the Parthenon greatly damaged the pediments. The blast caused some of the statues to fall and others to be out of balance, making a fall possible. Morosini was then ordered by the Venetian Senate to return to the Serenissima the "work of art considered the most important and the most refined." He decided to take some sculptures from the western pediment, probably the left-wing chariot, that of Athena. However, his men were ill-equipped and the statues crashed to the ground early in 1688. Only one female head (the Weber-Laborde head) found its way to Venice. In the same way, part of the head of one of the horses of Athena's chariot traveled to the Vatican.

The fate of the other fragments varied: some were used as building material for houses built on the acropolis; others were bought by European collectors passing through Athens during their Grand Tour. Excavations organized by the Greek state in the 1830s and 1840s brought to light many fragments.

As scholarly interest increased in the 19th century, a misapprehension developed among some German scholars, despite the existence of drawings of both pediments. James "Athenian" Stuart and Nicholas Revett discussed the presence of pedimental sculptures in the Parthenon in Athens in Vol II of their The Antiquities of Athens (1794). Ludwig Ross then argued in Das Theseion und der Tempel des Arcs (1852) that these existed in both the east and west pediments of the Parthenon. Francis Penrose provided evidence as regards the existence of sculptures on the west pediment in his Principles of Athenian Architecture (1851). This led Adolf Bötticher to surmise that only the west pediments had this feature, Untersuchungen auf der Akropolis (1863). However, following the publication of "Attische Bauwerke:I, Theseion" in 1873 by Cornelius Gurlitt and Ernst Ziller, the presence of pedimental architecture on both pediments of the Parthenon has generally been accepted.

The west group B and C is very damaged because it remained on the Parthenon until 1977, as was the western female figure W. The western group B and C (probably Cecrops and Pandrose) was not swept away by the agents of Lord Elgin at the beginning of the nineteenth century because they believed that it was a repair of the first centuries of our era that had replaced the original group by a statue tribute to the emperor Hadrian and his wife Sabine. This erroneous assumption was made at the end of the seventeenth century in Jacob Spon's (1678) and George Wheler (1682). travel narratives. The head of the horse of Helios' chariot, east C, was removed from the Parthenon in 1988.

== Conservation ==
The two pediments included about fifty statues. Only one, identified as Dionysus on the east side, kept his head. All others have disappeared or been dispersed across Europe. The statues are preserved in the British Museum, the Acropolis Museum in Athens and the Louvre Museum (Weber-Laborde head).

Much of what remains of the western pediment is in the British Museum. Busts (very damaged) of Athena, Poseidon, Amphitrite, Hermes and Iris (West L, M, O, H and N) are preserved. Although the Helios group and Iris suffered by the 1939 Duveen cleaning in the British Museum (the cleaning removed part of their historic surface and destroyed remnants of paint), overall the pediments escaped the cleaning compared to the frieze and metopes. A fragment of the helmet of the virgin goddess and the front of the bust of the sea god are on the other hand in the museum of the Acropolis, with fragments of the marine snake which was at the foot of Poseidon's wife.

The statues of the pediments are considered the archetype of classical sculpture.

== Bibliography ==
- Boardman, John (1985). Greek Sculpture : The Classical Period a handbook. London: Thames and Hudson.
- Boardman, John (1995). La Sculpture grecque classique. L'Univers de l'art. Translated by Lévy-Paoloni, Florence. Paris: Thames & Hudson.
- Brinkmann, Vinzenz; Koch-Brinkmann, Ulrike (2021). "Learning from Delphi. Provisional Thoughts on Interdependencies of Storytelling on the Siphnian Treasury and the Athenian Parthenon". In Bäbler, Balbina; Nesselrath, Heinz-Günther (eds.). Delphi. Apollons Orakel in der Welt der Antike.
- Cook, Brian (1984). The Elgin Marbles. London: British Museum Publications Ltd.
- Grimal, Pierre (1999). Dictionnaire de la mythologie grecque et romaine. Grands dictionnaires. Paris: Presses universitaires de France.
- Holtzmann, Bernard; Pasquier, Alain (1998). Histoire de l'art antique : l'Art grec. Manuels de l'École du Louvre. Paris: La Documentation française / Réunion des musées nationaux.
- Holtzmann, Bernard (2003). L'Acropole d'Athènes : Monuments, cultes et histoire du sanctuaire d'Athéna Polias. Paris: Picard.
- Michaelis, Adolf (1871). Der Parthenon. Leipzig: Breitkopf und Härtel.
- Neils, Jenifer (2006). The Parthenon Frieze. Cambridge University Press.
- Ousterhout, Robert (2005). ""Bestride the Very Peak of Heaven" : The Parthenon After Antiquity". In Neils, Jenifer (ed.). The Parthenon : From Antiquity to the Present. Cambridge University Press.
- Palagia, Olga (1993). The Pediments of the Parthenon. Monumenta Graeca et Romana. Brill.
- Palagia, Olga (2005). "Fire from Heaven : Pediments and Akroteria of the Parthenon". In Neils, Jenifer (ed.). The Parthenon : From Antiquity to the Present. Cambridge University Press.
- Pasquier, Alain (2007). "La " tête Laborde " rendue à elle-même". Comptes rendus des séances de l'Académie des Inscriptions et Belles-Lettres. 151 (4): 1951–1956.
- Rolley, Claude (1999). La Sculpture grecque, vol. II : La période classique. Manuels d'art et d'archéologie antiques. Picard.
- Saint-Clair, William (1983). Lord Elgin and the Marbles. Oxford University Press.
- Stanier, Robert Spenser (1953). "The Cost of the Parthenon". Journal of Hellenic Studies. 73: 68–76. doi:10.2307/628237. JSTOR 628237. S2CID 162847224.
