= Edward Garrison =

Edward Garrison may refer to:

- Edward H. Garrison, American jockey
- Edward B. Garrison, American art historian
