= MS Ham. 78.A.5 =

Manuscript

MS Ham. 78.A.5 (Staatliche Museen zu Berlin, Kupferstich-Kabinett, also known as the Hamilton Psalter) dates to late twelfth-century Italy (ca. 1175). The manuscript features nearly two hundred figurative illuminations that accompany the Gallican psalms, canticles, commentaries, a litany, and prayers. The illuminations are rendered primarily in vibrant red, green, yellow, and blue with black detailing. The manuscript is a unique survival with an unknown provenance before the early nineteenth century, during which it entered the collection of Alexander Hamilton, 10th Duke of Hamilton (1767–1852). The Berlin Kupferstichkabinett acquired the Psalter from Hamilton's collection in 1882.

== Binding ==
The manuscript was rebound in purple velvet with a gold trim at the beginning of the nineteenth century. The rebinding was likely commissioned by Hamilton and undertaken by Francis Benedict the Elder, a bookbinder based in London. Benedict rebound several manuscripts for Hamilton between 1807 and 1823. His bindings often include distinct spine attachments and recut block edges for gilding, features that distinguish him from his contemporaries in the trade. Although the Hamilton Psalter was trimmed, Benedict's involvement remains uncertain because the nineteenth-century backing was replaced in a 1965 conservation.

== Text contents ==
The manuscript begins with an introduction to the psalms based on Cassiodorus (quotes from Expositio psalmorum, fol. 1r–1v, 5r–8r), Damasus I and Jerome (letters, fols. 1v–4v, 8r–8v), and Augustine (excerpts from De civitate Dei, fols. 4v–5r). Psalms 1–150 follow the introduction (fols. 9r–125r). The Psalter is concluded by several additional prayers, including canticles (Canticum Isaiae, Hzechiae, Hannae, Mosis I, Habacuc, Mosis II, and Trium Puerorum in the Vulgate translation), the Benedictus, the Canticum Zachariae, the Magnificat, the Canticum of Simeonis, three creeds (Athanasian, Apostolic, and Nicene), and the Pater noster (fols. 125r–135r). The final section of the manuscript features a litany of saints (fols. 135r–136v) and three concluding prayers (fol. 136v).

== Script ==
The large initials that begin each psalm are rendered in paint or ink with the remaining word often in black capitalized uncials. The main text is written in a black Gothic script, not exceeding twenty-seven lines per page. The manuscript features the hands of several scribes.

== Text decoration ==
The texts and psalms begin with large initials, the majority of which are red and decorated with pen flourishes. The orations offered at the conclusion of each psalm are distinguished by similar initials in blue. The initials for individual verses, however, are marked by alternating blue and red letters of a uniform size to the main psalm text (a decoration shared by the manuscript's final prayers and litany). Of the opening initials, nine are elaborately painted, one of which also includes gilding (B of "Beatus vir"). The painted initials have geometric frames and, whereas five share foliate and inhabited/zoomorphic decorations (fols. 9v, 26r, 48r, 58v, and 71r), four feature only foliate designs (fols. 1r, 36r, 84r, and 96v). There is no pattern for the frequency of different initials in the manuscript, and their decoration is unrelated to the psalms they introduce. As a result, the meaning of the initials is unclear beyond ornamentation. Their distinct categories contrast with the largely consistent illumination style of the Psalter.

== Miniatures ==
The manuscript features 196 illuminations. These are divided between 192 miniatures and four large images (painted on over half of the page, fols. 1r, 45v–46r, and 47r). Each rendered in egg tempera with black details, the illuminations utilize the blank parchment as a base for figural skin tones and clothing. Although rare, ten miniatures also feature blue, all of which are included on the same pages as painted initials (where blue was already in use). Frames and backgrounds are absent, and the illuminations are based on the psalms and tituli (including Christological interpretations), biblical contexts, and historical commentaries (often author portraits of the introductory texts). Ten illuminations are described below, each sharing the dominant and largely unified illustrative program (in figural depictions, organization, themes, and colour) of the manuscript.

== Commentary ==
Although the circumstances under which the Hamilton Psalter was produced are unclear, most scholars agree that the manuscript has an Italian origin. In a 1931 catalogue for the Kupferstich-Kabinett, Paul Wescher tentatively places the Psalter's creation in northern Italy in the late twelfth century on the basis of its figurative style and robe depictions. His opinion was shared by Helmut Boese in a later catalogue of 1966. However, neither scholar is specific regarding a potential regional origin. Edward B. Garrison was the first to suggest that the Psalter bears similarity to Tuscan manuscripts of the twelfth century, especially in its "geometric" decoration of the red and blue initials. Despite these similarities, he argues that stylistic inconsistencies in the zoomorphic and scrollwork decoration make the Tuscan origin impossible to prove.

Wolfgang Augustyn is the only scholar to have published extensively on the Hamilton Psalter. He shares Garrison's opinion that the manuscript was created in Tuscany, likely during a Vallombrosian Benedictine reform movement (ca. 1175) for monastic use (rather than liturgical). In the absence of a calendar, he argues that the concluding litany of saints supports this geographical origin because some of the figures were revered primarily in the Vallombrosian tradition of the region. For example, St. Zenobius, St. Salvius of Albi, and Romulus (the first bishop of Florence) were popular saints in Tuscan worship who also appear in other manuscripts created by the Vallombrosians in the dioceses of Florence and Fiesole (including the monasteries of St. Fedele in Poppi and St. Paulo a Ripa in Pisa). One such manuscript in the Biblioteca Laurenziana (MS. Acq. e Doni 181), produced in the monastery of St. Paulo a Ripa, shares similar extensive lists of intercessions for each saint as the Hamilton Psalter, as well as a repetition of the Pater noster at the litany's conclusion.

It is likely that the illustrators of the Hamilton Psalter drew on both old and contemporary models of manuscript illumination, often rendering twelfth-century compositions in an Antique or Byzantine style. Whereas Wescher argues that the Psalter relied on Catalan manuscripts of the late eleventh and early twelfth century, Augustyn believes that several Northern Italian manuscripts served as models. These include the Sacramentary of Warmund (Ivrea, Biblioteca Capitolare, cod. 86, late tenth century), a manuscript that shares the narrow elongated bodies, bold clothing folds, and short robe lengths of the Hamilton Psalter. In addition, the folding robes and movements of the figures in the Psalter are similar to the Northern Italian Gospels of Matilda (New York, Pierpont Morgan Library, MS. 492, 1071-1099). The popularity of the Utrecht and Stuttgart Psalters by the twelfth century likewise suggest their influence on the illustration program. Although they were removed (as models of models), the Hamilton Psalter shares similar organizations of its miniatures through depictions of linear narratives within Christological, Davidic, and literal interpretations of the psalms. For example, the Hamilton and Utrecht illuminations of Psalm 80 both represent Moses and the Israelites before God. While the scene is more animated in Utrecht, featuring Moses smiting the rock as the Israelites tend their fields and beehives (verse 17), the Psalters share an Exodus interpretation of the psalm.

The manuscript is the only psalter to survive intact from twelfth-century Italy. There are, however, fragments of contemporary psalters that feature similar styles of decoration. For instance, Christie's 2023 auction of a leaf from a twelfth-century Italian psalter features an illuminated E initial for Psalm 80. Although set in a lighter colour scheme, the painted E shares the unusual background quadrants, foliate decorations, and clover depictions of the Hamilton Psalter.

The Hamilton Psalter is distinct in attesting to the evolving visual traditions of depicting the psalms through its combination of textual (literal), contextual (historical), and Christological representations. These illuminations extend the meaning of the psalms into the New Testament and Davidic history, visually suggesting linear temporal interpretations that are emphasized by additional red captions (often referencing other biblical books) in order to guide the reader. This visual program also details the psalms' history of transmission, both biblically and in the early Church, to draw a parallel with the manuscript's original monastic context. Despite the often "quickly" executed nature of the illuminations, they retain a largely unified program, sharing similar organizations, colour schemes, and text/image spatial relationships.

== Provenance ==
Although the folios are numbered in an eighteenth-century hand, the surviving records of the manuscript only begin in the nineteenth century as part of Hamilton's collection (for whom the Kupferstichkabinett collection is named). The French notes at the beginning of the manuscript, likewise written in an eighteenth-century hand, indicate that he may have purchased it from a French dealer. The Psalter measures 18.2 x 27.2 cm and consists of 279 pages. It was acquired by Wilhelm von Bode (1845–1929) and Karl Friedrich Lippmann (1853–1957) for the Berlin Kupferstichkabinett in 1882.

== Bibliography ==
Augustyn, Wolfgang. "Zu Herkunft und Stil des lateinischen Hamilton-Psalters im Berliner Kupferstichkabinett (78 A5)." Jahrbuch der Berliner Museen 31 (1989): 107–26.

Augustyn, Wolfgang. Der Lateinische Hamilton-Psalter im Berliner Kupferstichkabinett (78 A 5). Hildesheim, Zurich: Weidmann, 1996.

Boese, Helmut. Die lateinischen Handschriften der Sammlung Hamilton zu Berlin. Wiesbaden: Otto Harrassowitz Verlag, 1966. https://bilder.manuscripta-mediaevalia.de/hs/kataloge/HSK0007.htm.

Garrison, Edward B. Studies in the History of Medieval Italian Painting. 2nd ed. Vol. IV. London: Pindar Press, 1993.

Wescher, Paul. Beschreibendes Verzeichnis der Miniaturen Handschriften und Einzelblätter des Kupferstichkabinetts der Staatlichen Museen Berlin. Leipzig: J. J. Weber, 1931.
