= CIG =

CIG may refer to:

== Organizations ==
- Cambridge Information Group, a privately held global investment firm focusing on information services, education and technology
- Confederación Intersindical Galega (Galician InterTrade Union Confederation) is a Galician Trade union with the legal status of more representative trade union in Spain
- Columbia Insurance Group, a private US insurance company
- Central Intelligence Group, the predecessor to the Central Intelligence Agency, active between 1946 and 1947
- Cloud Imperium Games, a PC game software developer
- CIG, New York Stock Exchange stock symbol for Companhia Energetica de Minas Gerais S.A.
- Conflict Insights Group, a private security research firm

== Others ==
- The IEEE Conference on Computational Intelligence and Games, an annual conference on computational intelligence research related to game applications
- Cig, a colloquial term for a cigarette
- The Canadian Improv Games, an annual nationwide Improvisation competition for high school students in Canada
- Corpus Inscriptionum Graecarum (Berlin, 1825–1877), the first attempt at a standard corpus of the Greek inscriptions of Antiquity
- Computational Infrastructure for Geodynamics, an organization that develops and maintains open-source software for computational geophysics
- Conditional Intensity Group, used in convective outlooks issued by the Storm Prediction Center.
- IATA airport code for Craig-Moffat Airport
- Cig, a village in Tăşnad Town, Satu Mare County, Romania
- Copper indium gallium selenide solar cells, a kind of a flexible, thin film solar cell
- Career Integration Grants, part of Marie Curie Actions European research grants
- Converter interfaced generation
- CIG, an abbreviation for the Corpus Inscriptionum Graecarum a collection of ancient Greek inscriptions
- CIGS, an abbreviation for Chief of the Imperial General Staff, the predecessor of the British Chief of the General Staff post
