= Edward B. Garrison =

American art historian

Edward B. Garrison (1900–1981) was an American art historian who specialised in medieval Italian painting, publishing landmark books on the subject. He compiled a large collection of photographs to illustrate his books, which he donated to the Courtauld Institute of Art in London.

== Personal life and education ==
Edward Garrison was born in Chicago in 1900 and died in London on 16 October 1981.

He began his career in business, but changed direction in 1945 when he studied for an MA at the Institute of Fine Arts, New York.

== Career ==
Garrison spent much of his life as an art historian in Italy, travelling extensively. He worked as an independent researcher, publishing an important series of books on medieval Italian paintings. In 1949 he published "Italian Romanesque Panel Painting: An Illustrated Index", which is still used in the study of medieval Italian painting. Between 1953 and 1962 he published a series of four books Studies in the History of Mediaeval Italian Painting. This series included, for the first time, photographs of all twelfth century miniatures from the Papal States and Tuscany, as well as photographs of decorated manuscripts, wall paintings and panels.

== Photographic archive ==
Garrison collected a large photographic archive of medieval Italian art, which he donated to the Courtauld Institute of Art in 1962. It is known as the Garrison Collection and he became its honorary curator. The collection is an important source of material for medieval Italian art studies.

The collection is currently being digitised by the Courtauld Institute of Art as part of a larger digitisation project of the Conway Library.

== Legacy ==
Garrison is considered to have made a "fundamental contribution to the study of medieval Italian painting".

The Garrison Collection at the Courtauld Institute of Art is an important source for the study of medieval Italian art.

== See also ==
- MS Ham. 78.A.5

== Bibliography ==
- Garrison, E.B., 1949. Italian romanesque panel painting: an illustrated index. Florence: L.S. Olschki.
- Garrison, E.B., 1953–62. Studies in the history of mediaeval Italian painting. 4 Volumes. Florence: L'Impronta.
- Garrison, E.B., 1984. Early Italian painting: selected studies. Volume II - Manuscripts. London: Pindar Press.
- Garrison, E.B., 1984. Early Italian painting: selected studies. Volume I - Panels & frescoes. London: Pindar Press.
- Garrison, E.B., Revised 1993. Studies in the history of mediaeval Italian painting. 4 Volumes. London: Pindar Press.
- Garrison, E.B., 1998. Italian romanesque panel painting: an illustrated index: a new edition on CR-ROM with revised bibliography and iconclass. London: Courtauld Institute of Art.
