= Tomb of Antenor =

Monument in Padova (Italy)

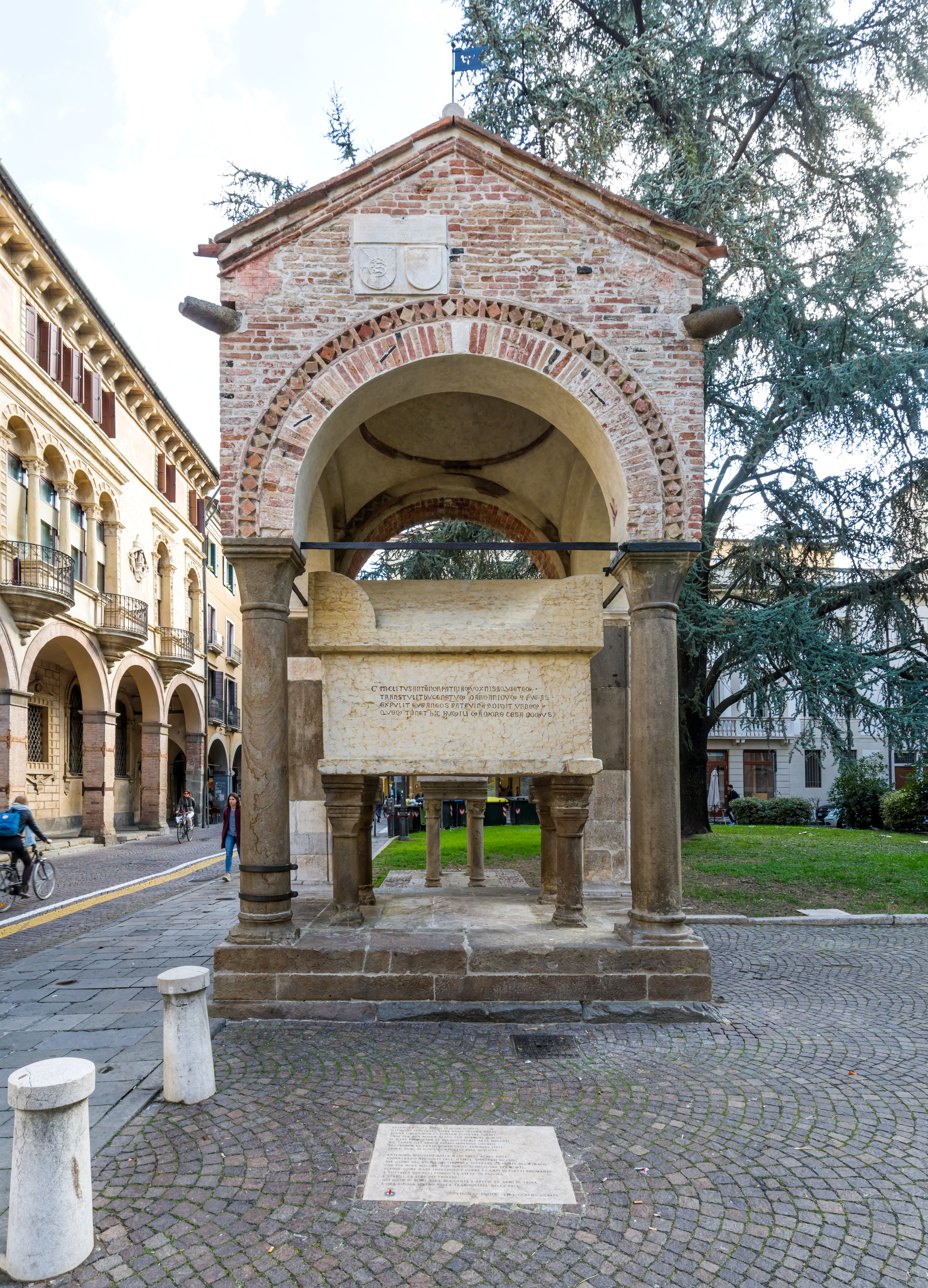
Tomb of Antenor

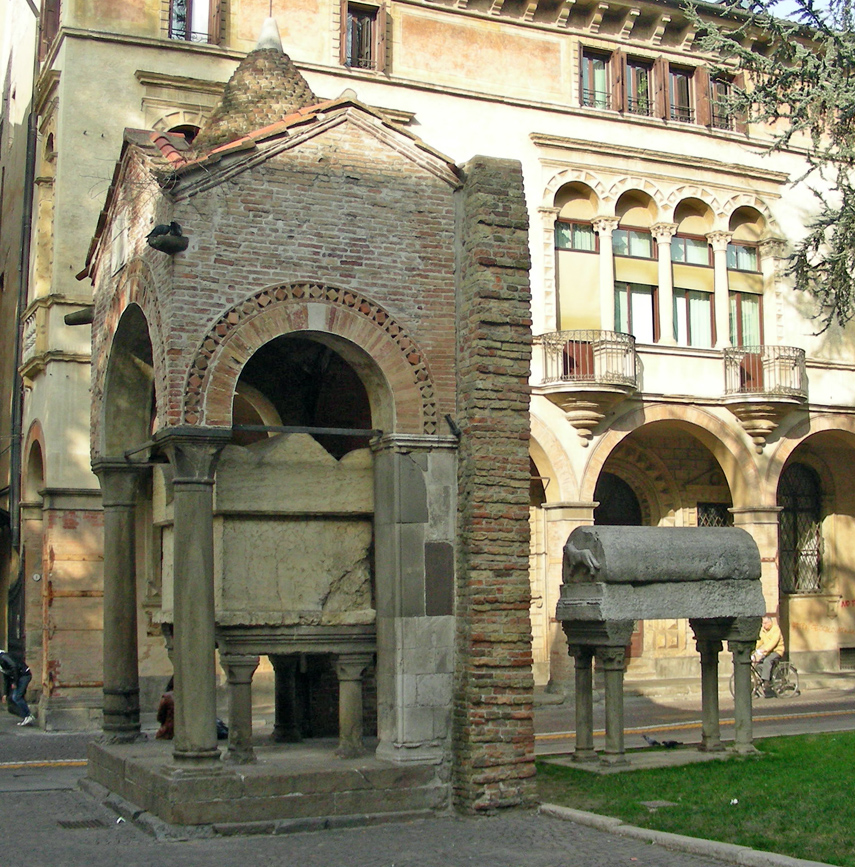
Tomb of Antenor

The Tomb of Antenor, also called the Sepulchre of Antenore, is a 13th-century monument created to honor an unearthed ancient sarcophagus, claimed to be that of the Trojan warrior and counselor Antenor, the legendary founder of Padua; it is located in Piazza Antenore, in Padua, region of Veneto, Italy.

== History ==
In 1274, during the construction of an orphanage in Padua, an ancient marble sarcophagus was uncovered. A local scholar, Lovato dei Lovati, said to have found inscriptions on a bronze plaque attached to the inner wooden coffin, stating the burial contained the body of Antenor. The founding of Padua by Antenor, counselor to King Priam of Troy, who fled from the Homeric city, was likely a poetic invention of Virgil, who states in book 1 of the Aeneid:

Antenor could escape the Achaean host, thread safely the Illyrian gulfs and inmost realms of the Liburnians, and pass the springs of Timavus, and whence through nine mouths, with a mountain’s mighty roar, it comes a bursting flood and buries the fields under its sounding sea. Yet here he set Padua’s town, a home for his Teucrians, gave a name to the race, and hung up the arms of Troy; now, settled in tranquil peace, he is at rest.

Lovato commissioned the construction of the present monument, completed by 1284, consisting of a mostly freestanding open tabernacle-like structures rising above the ground, with a sarcophagus sheltered by simple baldachin. The outdoor design recalls the display of the Scaliger tombs in Verona, but this monument is earlier and simpler. The pagan founder of the town was honored in front, but not inside, the church of San Lorenzo, in a location in front of Lovato's house. Further legends grew out of the monument: for example, it was said that in 1334, the Veronese conqueror of Padua, Alberto II della Scala, had the sarcophagus re-opened to find a golden sword.

In 1995, during restorations, an opening to the center of the sarcophagus revealed a disturbed coffin with various bones, including a skull, a female femur, and even some animal bones. Carbon-dating of a fragment of bone found dates consistent with the late Roman Empire, that is, the 3rd or 4th centuries.
