= Kouros =

Ancient Greek sculptures

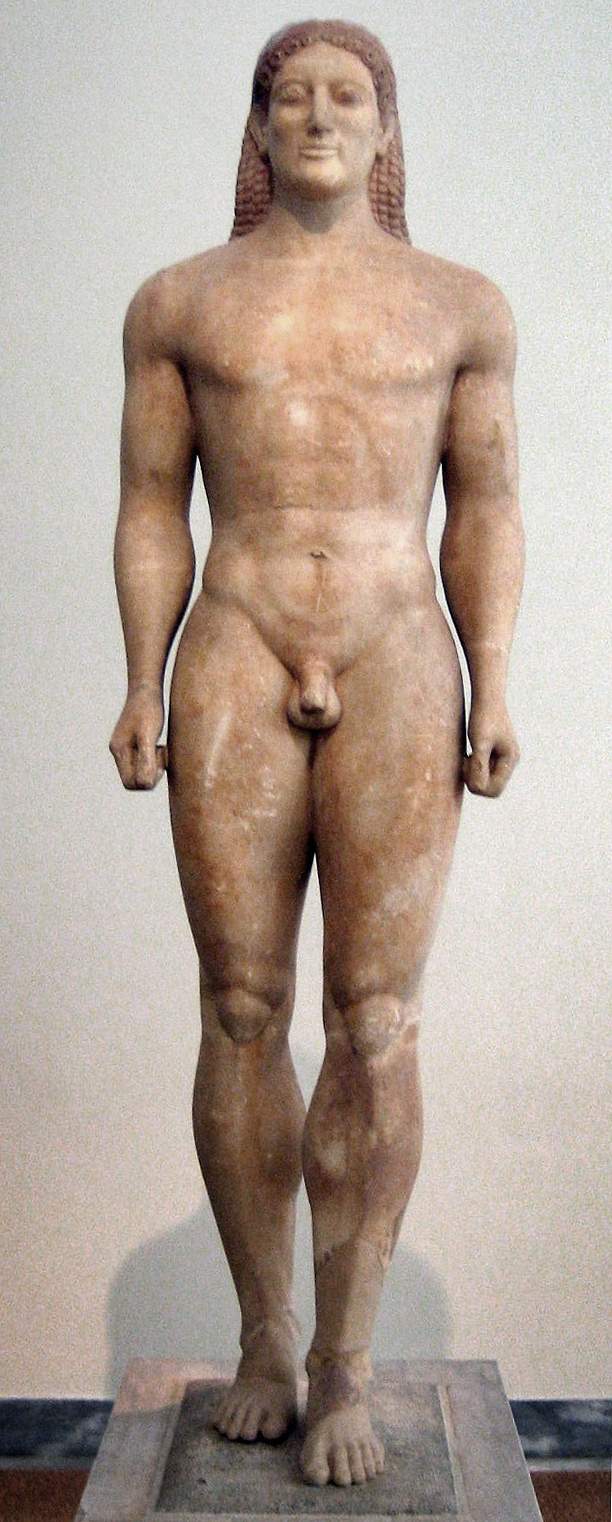
Kroisos Kouros, c. 530 BC

Kouros (Ancient Greek: κοῦρος, pronounced [kûːros], plural kouroi) is the modern term (Note: In the accompanying epigraphy the dedicatory formula was "[X] dedicated me to [Y]", there seems to have been no generic term for these sculptures used in the ancient literature, see Morris (1994).) given to free-standing Ancient Greek sculptures that depict nude male youths. They first appear in the Archaic period in Greece and are prominent in Attica and Boeotia, with a less frequent presence in many other Ancient Greek territories such as Sicily. Such statues are found across the Greek-speaking world; the preponderance of these were found in sanctuaries of Apollo with more than one hundred from the sanctuary of Apollo Ptoion, Boeotia, alone. These free-standing sculptures were typically marble, but the form is also rendered in limestone, wood, bronze, ivory and terracotta. They are typically life-sized, though early colossal examples are up to 10 feet/3 metres tall.

The female sculptural counterpart of the kouros is the kore.

== Etymology ==
The Ancient Greek word kouros (κοῦρος) refers to "youth, boy, especially of noble rank." When a pubescent was received into the body of grown men, as a grown Kouros, he could enter the initiation fest of the brotherhood (phratry, φρατρία). Apellaios was the month of these rites, and Apollo (Apellon) was the "megistos kouros" (the greatest Kouros).

The word is also attested in Linear B, a syllabic system of writing used to record the Mycenaean Greek dialect of the Hellenic languages. The word ko-wo (*κόρϝος, *kórwos) is attested in tablets from Pylos and Knossos, and could mean "the sons of the women recorded in those tablets".

The term kouros was first proposed for what were previously thought to be depictions of Apollo by V.I. Leonardos in 1895 in relation to the youth from Keratea, and adopted by Henri Lechat as a generic term for the standing male figure in 1904.

== Purpose ==
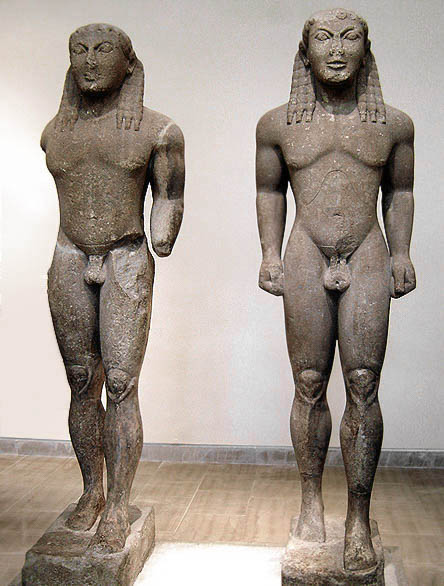
Kleobis and Biton c. 580 BC (Delphi: Archaeological Museum)

The kouros type appears to have served several functions. It was previously thought that it was used only to represent the god Apollo, as attested by its depiction on a vase painting in the presence of supplicants. This association with Apollo was supported by the description of the statue of the Pythian Apollo at Samos by Diodoros as "Egyptian in style, with his arms hanging by his sides and his legs parted". However, not all kouroi are images of a deity; many have been discovered in cemeteries where they likely served as commemorative tombstones of the deceased. This type was also used as a memorial for victors in the games (like trophies), kouroi were used as offerings to the gods, (Pausanias describes the statue of Arrhichion, an Olympic pankratiast, as in the kouros scheme), and some kouroi have been found in sanctuaries other than that of Apollo. Indeed, some kouroi placed in sanctuaries were not inscribed with the name of the god but with a mortal, for example the 'Delphi Twins' Kleobis and Biton were honoured for their piety with matching kouroi.

== Origin and evolution ==
The evolution of the kouros type is inevitably linked to that of the overall development of monumental Archaic Greek sculpture. There are fundamentally two schools of thought on how Daedalic forms, some of which we know of only from the literature (kolossos, bretas, andrias and xoanon), became the free-standing sculpture in around the 6th century; namely, that it was a response to the internal development of Greek types and religious needs or a product of foreign influence. For an external cause for change, possible sources of influence have been cited, such as Egypt, Anatolia and Syria, with the strongest case made for Egypt, in particular the figure of Horus. It is known that the Greeks had longstanding trade relations with Egypt prior to the founding of the Greek entrepôt of Naukratis in the mid-7th century, where the Greeks could have learned Egyptian sculpting methods. (Note: Though note that only a little Archaic sculpture has been found in Naukratis and it is not monumental.) A 1978 study by Eleanor Guralnick applied stereophotogrammetric measurement and cluster analysis to a number of Greek and Egyptian statues and found the correlation between the Second Canon of the 26th Dynasty and Greek kouroi to be widely distributed but not universal.

Saite sculpture from the Egyptian 26th dynasty, similar in proportion and form to the early kouros type, Louvre

The work of Guralnick along with the previous studies by Erik Iversen and Kim Levin have added considerably to the argument for an imitation by Greek sculptors of Egyptian sculpture. The system of proportion in the second Egyptian canon of the Saite period consisted of a grid of twenty-one and one-fourth parts, with twenty-one squares from the soles of the feet to a line drawn through the centre of the eyes. The grid was applied to the surface of the block being carved, allowing the major anatomical features to be located at fixed grid points. Iversen has shown that the New York kouros conforms to this ratio of proportion. It was Guralnick, however, who developed this discovery by comparing other kouroi by means of cluster and Z-score profile analysis to the Egyptian Canon II and a control group composed of statistically average Mediterranean men. As a result, she has identified two strains within methods of proportioning in sixth century kouroi, where the majority follow the general line of evolution from the foreign model towards an idealized human norm. (Note: Subsequent study by Carter & Steinberg (2010) casts doubt on Guralnick's results. They maintain that while there two principal groups of kouroi there is not a statistically significant correlation between the Greek and Egyptian forms, and the differences can be accounted for by the variation in the development of regional styles.)

According to Hurwit & Campbell: "Kouroi apparently first appeared on the island of Naxos, since most early examples are in Naxian marble".

== Attributes and meaning ==
Kouroi are beardless, take a formulaic advancing posture, and are most often nude. (Note: This is begging the question, of course, whether kouroi so defined form a different category from other male figures, namely draped youths, cuirassed or armed warriors, or bearded figures. See Ridgway (1993).) Taking from the style of Egyptian figures, Greek kouroi often have their left leg extended forward as though walking; however, the figurine looks as though it could be either standing still or taking a long stride. A small number of early kouroi are belted around their waists, a practice that died out at the turn of the sixth century. Such belts have traditionally been assumed to be an abbreviated symbol of a more complex costume, (Note: Deonna, Broadman for example; see Ridgway (1993).) however fully clothed contemporary figures also exist, suggesting that it was not just a sculptor's shorthand for clothing but a signifier in itself. Art historian B.S. Ridgway suggests that this may have been an attribute of Apollo, athleticism or magical powers, though its iconography remains obscure. Further, there is the question of the nudity of the kouros and if this is also an attribute. Again this may have represented athletic or heroic nudity – immortalising the youth as he appeared in the palaestra, but no examples have been found at Olympia nor do they bear any allusion to athletic equipment.

As well as being found in the sanctuaries of Apollo at Delphi, Delos and Mt. Ptoion, kouroi have been found dedicated at the sanctuaries of Hera at Samos, and of Athena and Poseidon at Sounion, so the contention that they depict Apollo is at the very least problematic. However, the majority are from Apollonian sites and dedicated to that god, which has led Ridgway (1993) to suggest that the early, belted form of the kouros-type statue was introduced in the late seventh century as a replacement for the colossal representation of Apollo. Perhaps over time, the votive and funerary functions of the sculpture became divorced whilst its attributes were shed and its form became more generic until, in the late sixth century, it could serve a number of uses depending on context and location. This 'polyvalent' argument, initially put forth by historian Jean Ducat, was elaborated by art historian Andrew Stewart, who contends the distribution of kouroi coincides with city-states where the aristocracy were in ascendancy and that this alternation between the divine and the memorial was an identification of aristocratic arete with the immortal.

== Development ==
The earliest extant examples may be the two life-sized marble figures from the Ionic sanctuary on the island of Delos dating from the second or third quarter of the seventh century. The canonical form of the kouros persists until the beginning of the classical period, by which time artists had achieved a high degree of anatomical verisimilitude, if not naturalism, as can be observed on such transitional works as the Kritios Boy, c. 480 BC. The absolute chronology of the kouros form is uncertain; none of the sculptures have secure dates.

There is a strong homogeneity across the various regional schools: where anatomical innovations were adopted they seem to have spread quickly amongst the different workshops so that "regional distinctions become merged in a common progression". Consequently, the development of the kouros type as we now understand it is based on the relative chronology delineated by Richter, who distinguishes six groups by their common anatomical features, with particular reference to the major muscle groups as illustrated in the écorchés.

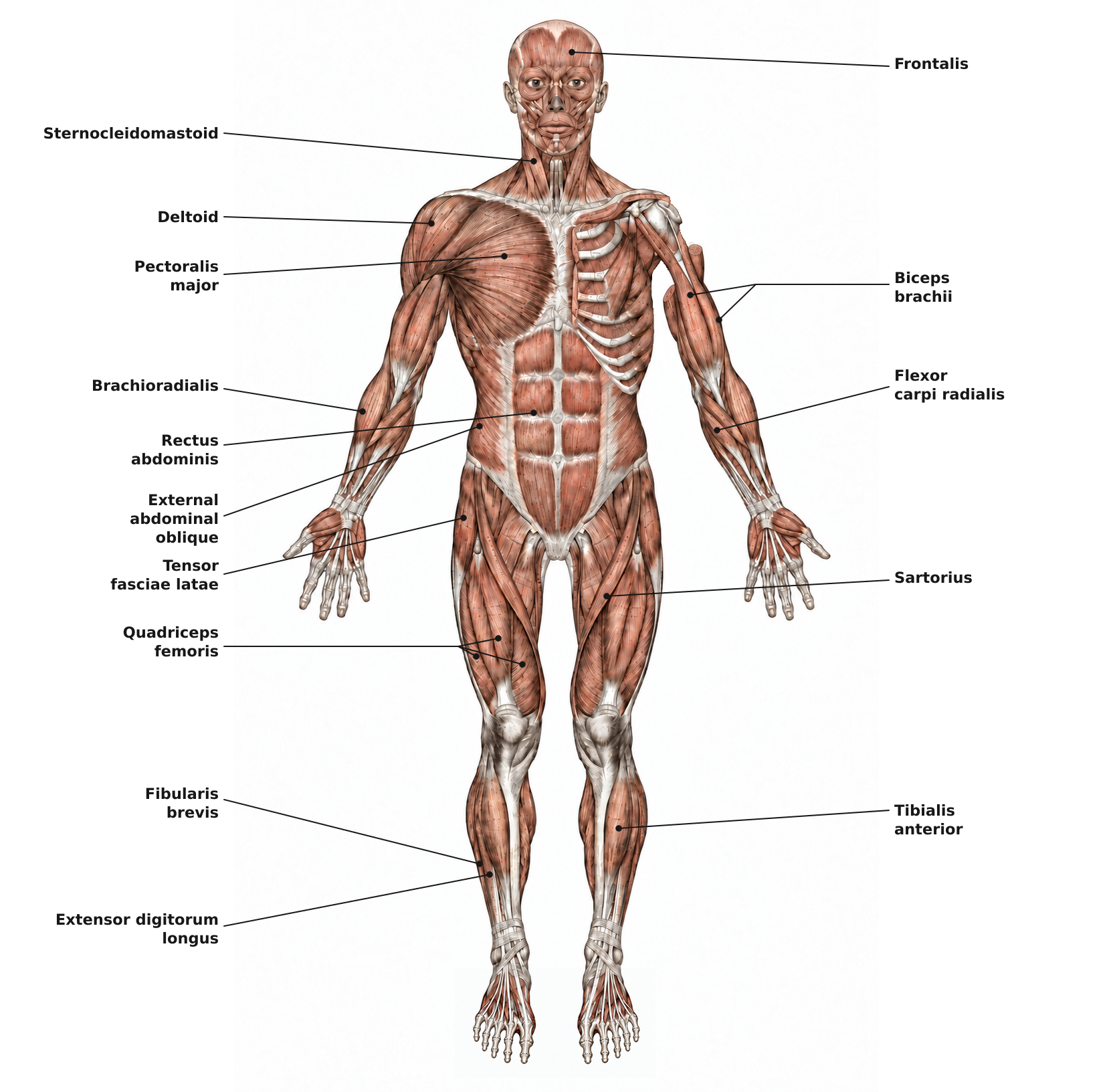
Écorché (muscles anterior labeled)

=== Sounion group ===
C. 615–590 BCE: the dates of this period are tentative, roughly late seventh-early sixth century, which Richter infers from the duration of development necessary for the previous generations from the more securely dated Tenea-Volomandra group. Additionally she notes a similarity of sculpture from this time to early Athenian pottery, particularly the Nessos amphora and the human figures on the Horse amphorae. Richter also detects a resemblance between the New York-Sounion kouroi and an early Corinthian pyxis of the last quarter of the seventh century. Notable works of the time include the New York kouros, Dermys and Kittylos, Delphi Twins, the Sounion kouros, and the Delos colossus.

The conception of form in this period is abstract and geometrical, emphasis is on architectural shape and the interrelation of parts which favoured expressive pattern over realism. Figures display the four faces of the block from which they are carved, their form is cubic with details incised, and their anatomy is only partially understood. Harmony and expressive pattern are the goal, and as such the proportions are abnormal. The torso is four-sided and flat, the back is higher than chest with the vertebral column expressed as a straight line. The skull is undeveloped; flat at the back and often on top. The ear is carved in one plane, and highly stylized. Tragus is knob like, either on cheek or lobe. Antitragus is not indicated. The eyes are large and flat, canthus is not marked, lachrymal caruncle is not indicated. The mouth is horizontal, with lips on same plane, and corners of mouth forming triangular depressions. Hair is arranged in parallel beaded tresses, which rarely radiates from the vertex. The Sterno-mastoids, when marked, are indicated by grooves running to the sternal notch. There is no indication of swelling of trapezius on the outline of shoulders. The clavicles are flat ridges along whole course of shoulders. Median line is sometimes marked by a groove from sternal notch to navel. The lower boundary of the thorax has the shape of a pointed arch. Rectus abdominis is formed by three or more transverse divisions above navel. The navel is generally a knob in a circular groove. Serratus magnus is not indicated. The shoulder blades are outlined by grooves on the surface of back. The erector spinae attachment to posterior part of the iliac crest is sometimes indicated by grooves in the lumbar regions. Forearm is supinated, with palm towards the body. Arms often separated from body between armpit and hand. Thumbs are large. Vastus internus descends to about the same level as vastus externus, the shin is vertical, and the malleoli are level. Weight is evenly distributed on both legs and the flanks are level.

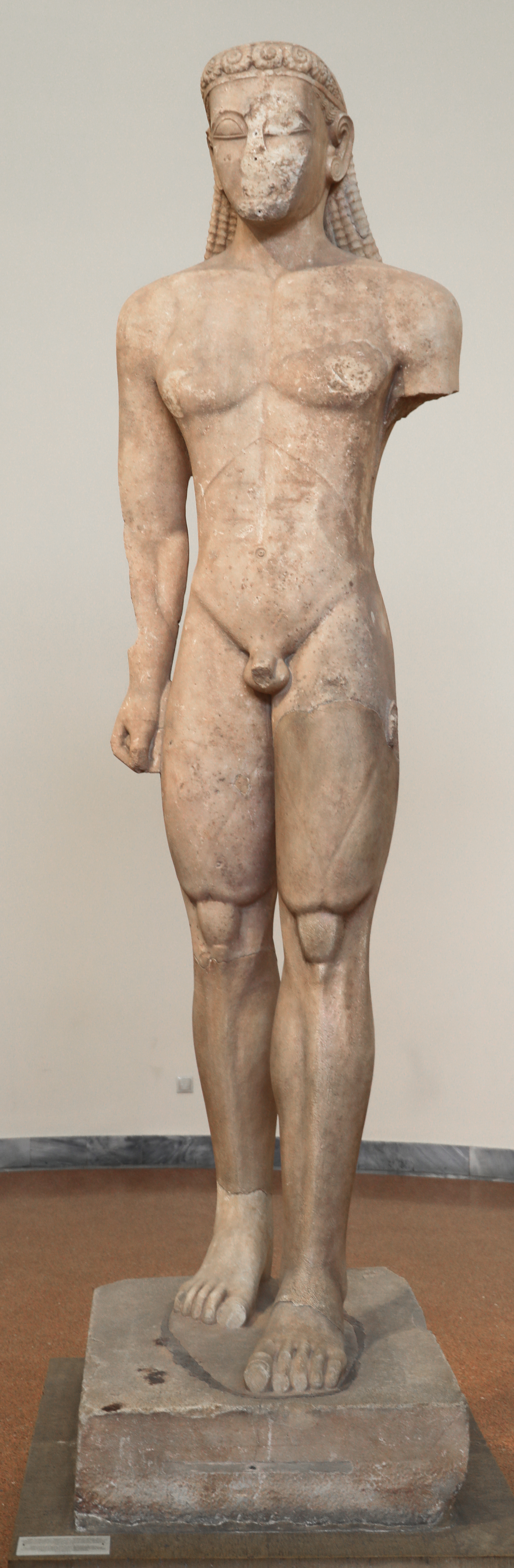
Sounion kouros

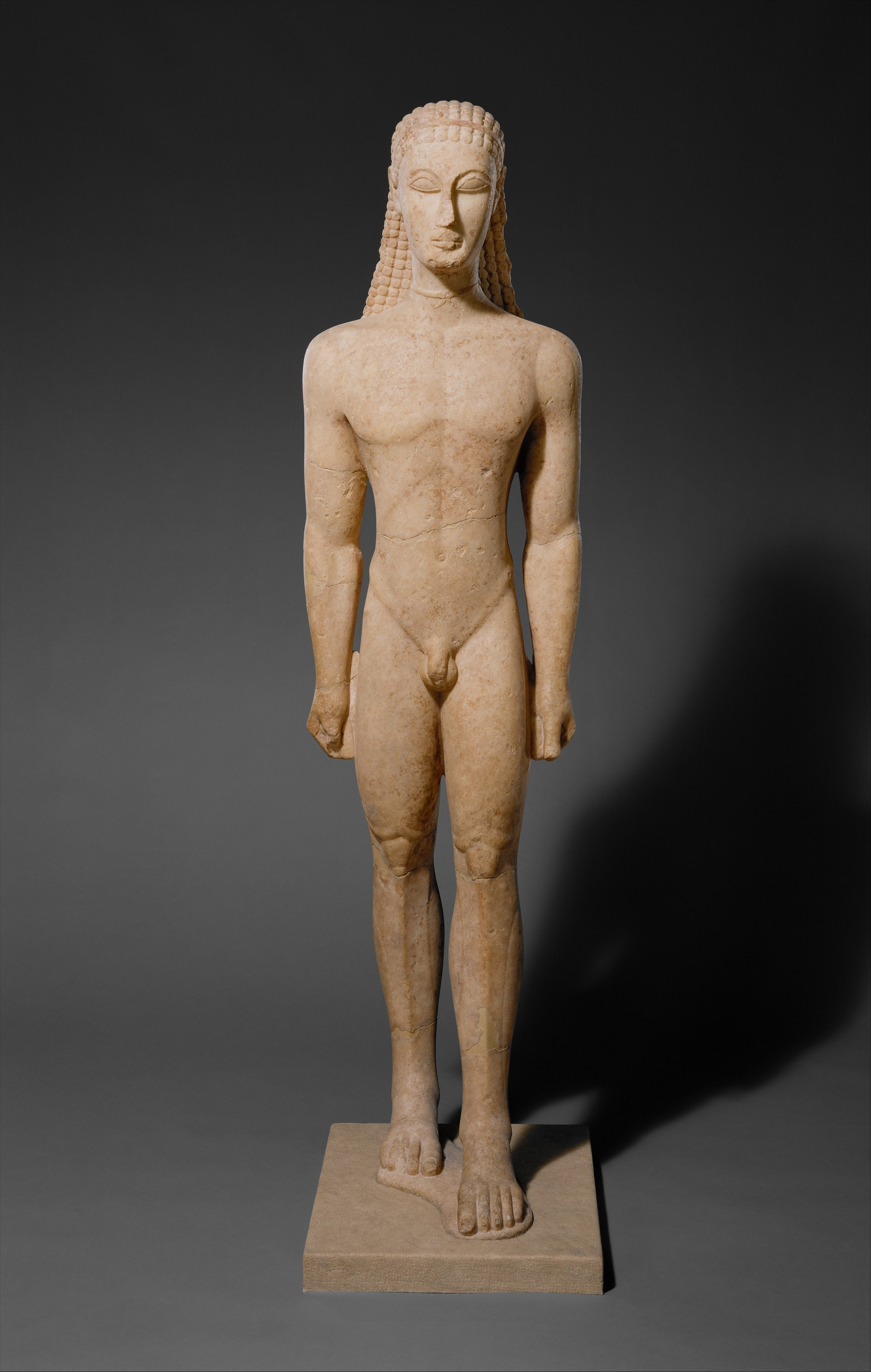
New York Kouros

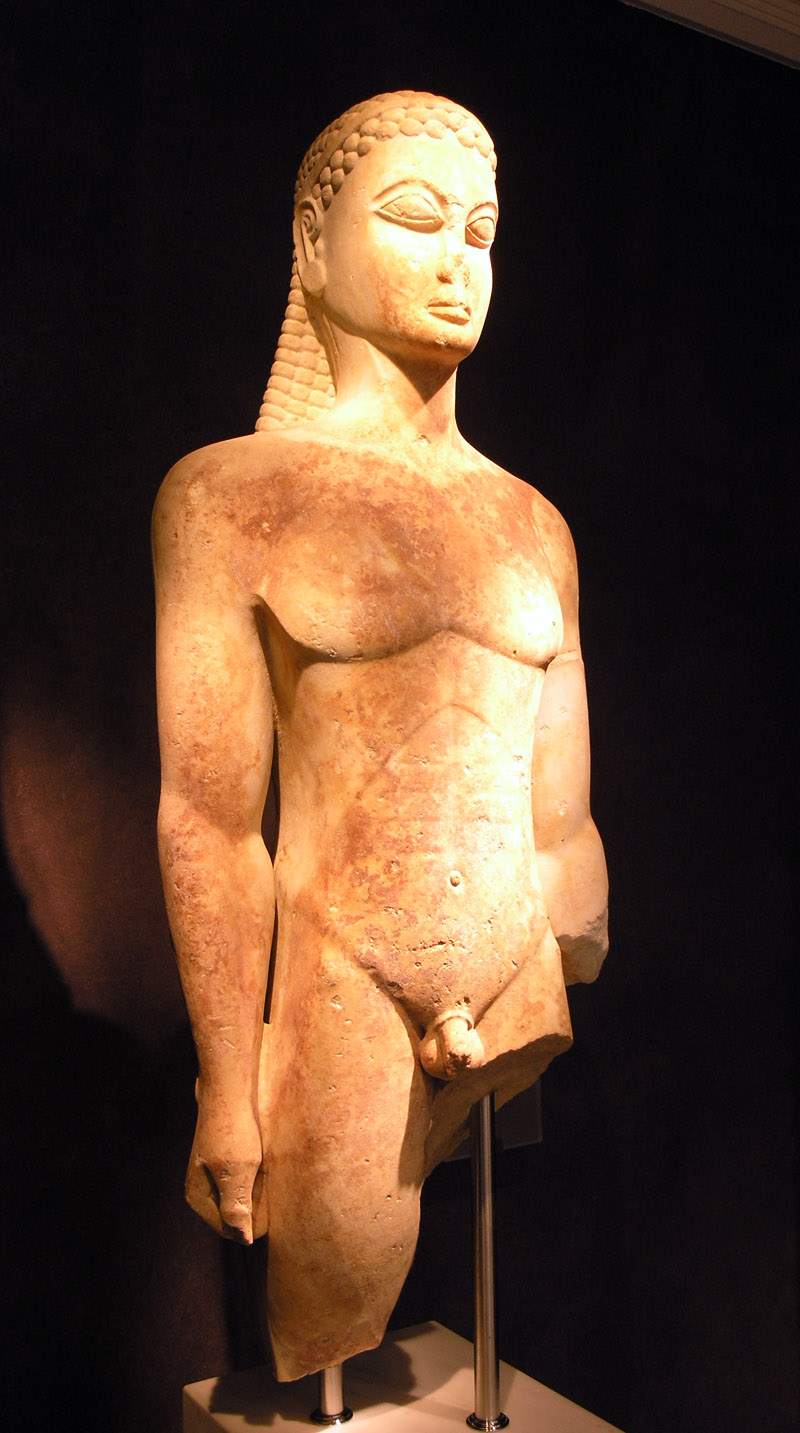
Kouros Porte Sacrée Kerameikos Archaeological Museum, Athens (KAMA)

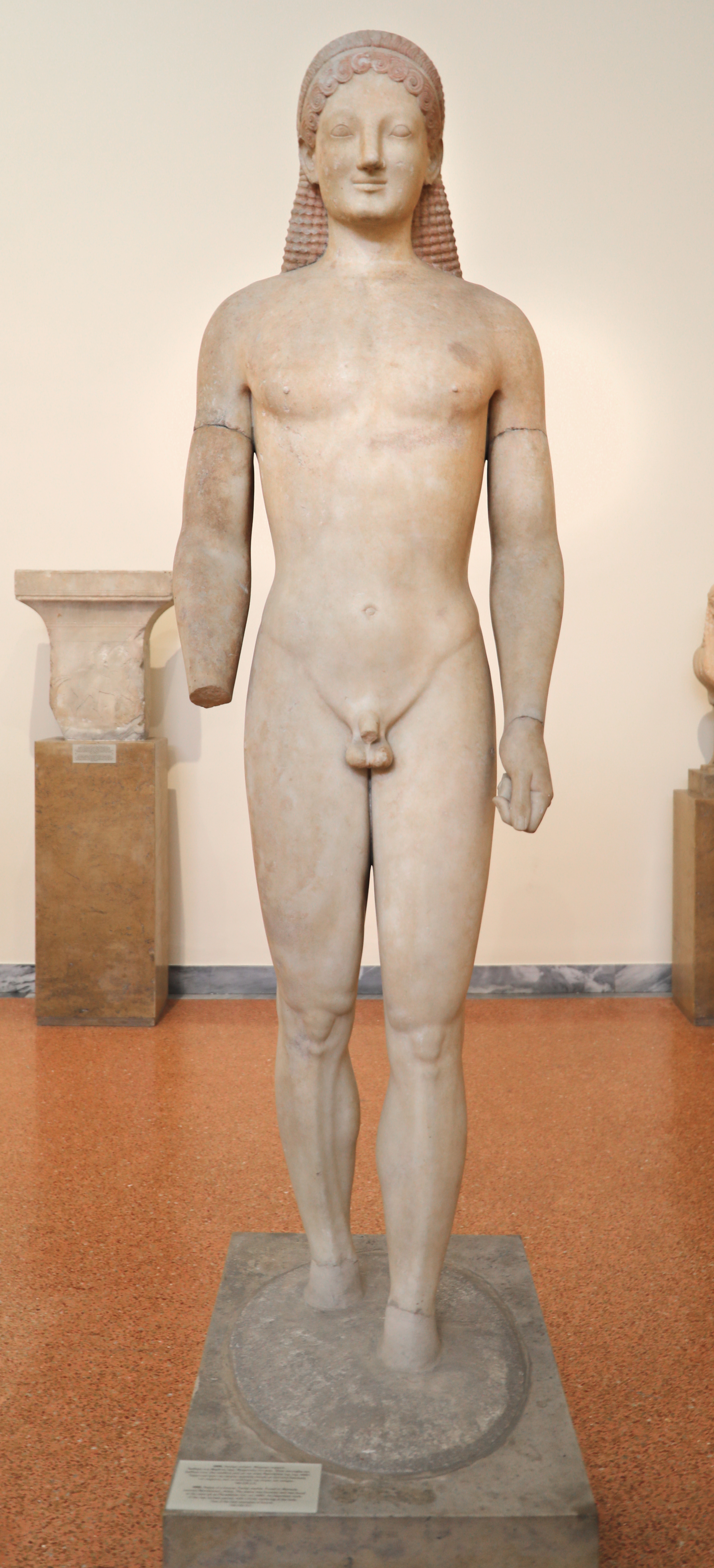
Athens

=== Orchomenos–Thera group ===
C. 590–570 BCE: this period witnesses a lull in Attica with perhaps only two identifiable works from the beginning of the era until the second quarter of the century. This might be due to the Solonic reforms and their restriction on the extravagance of private funerals. Activity is more vigorous in Boeotia, especially those from the Ptoan sanctuary and the Orchomenos kouros. Early work there is probably native. Also in Corinth, Actium produces one of the best examples of the period. Detailing is still of in the form of grooves and ridges but there is the beginning of modeling in the full roundness of natural forms. One of the more accomplished products of the time is the Thera kouros, which is softer and less muscular in modeling. It is more Ionian than Dorian, even though Thera was a Dorian colony. We may deduce the chronology of this period only if the dates for the Sounion and Volomandra groups are correct since there is no external evidence for the dates of this style; however, we can usefully compare the heads in vase paintings of middle Corinthian period (600-575 BCE) which share the same stolid expressions, flat skulls, large eyes and horizontal mouths.

The characteristics of this style are as follows: the ear is still carved in one plane, but is less stylised. Eyes are not so large as before and more rounded. The mouth is horizontal but no longer always in one plane. The slight protrusions of flanks are sometimes prolonged into a girdle-like ridge. The sculptor occasionally marks the anterior spine of the crest. Shoulder blades are now separate raised planes. The erector spinae is sometimes indicated as raised planes. Arms are generally joined to the body. The depression over the great trochanter is generally omitted. The shins sometimes curve inwards. The left flank is occasionally placed slightly forward.

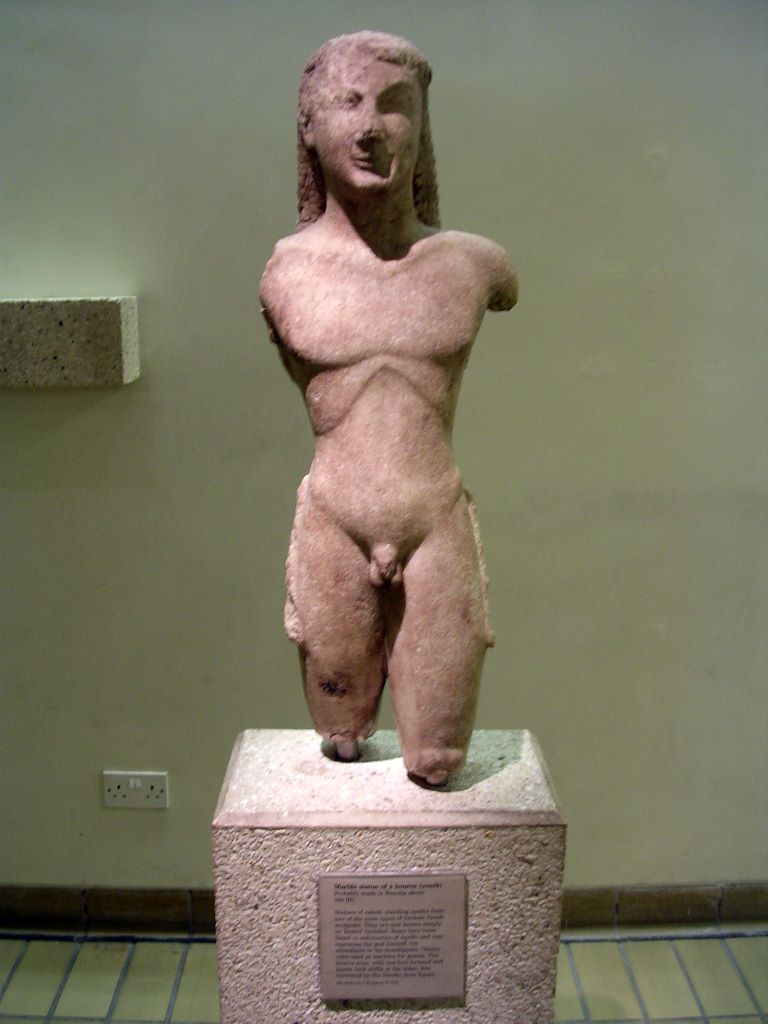
British Museum, London

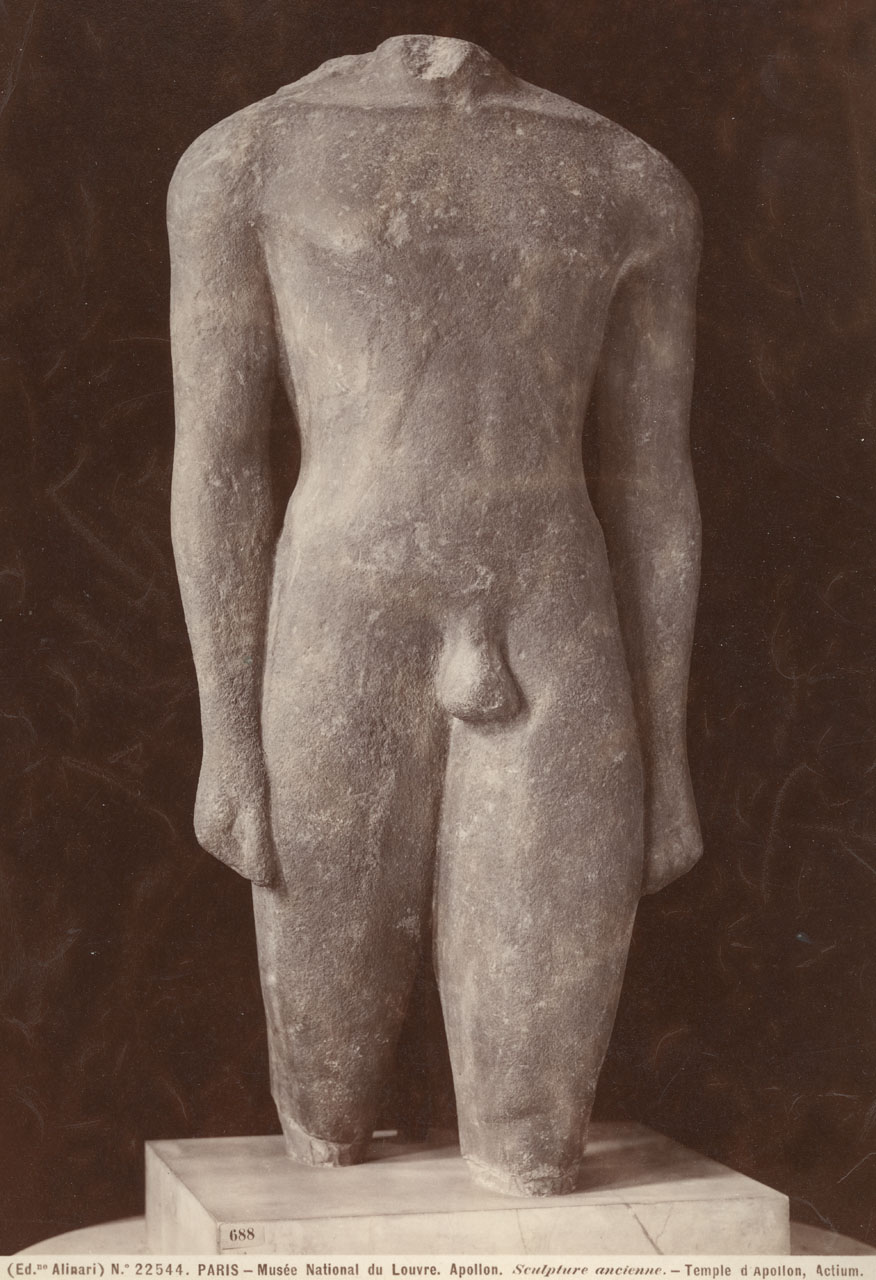
Actium 3, Louvre

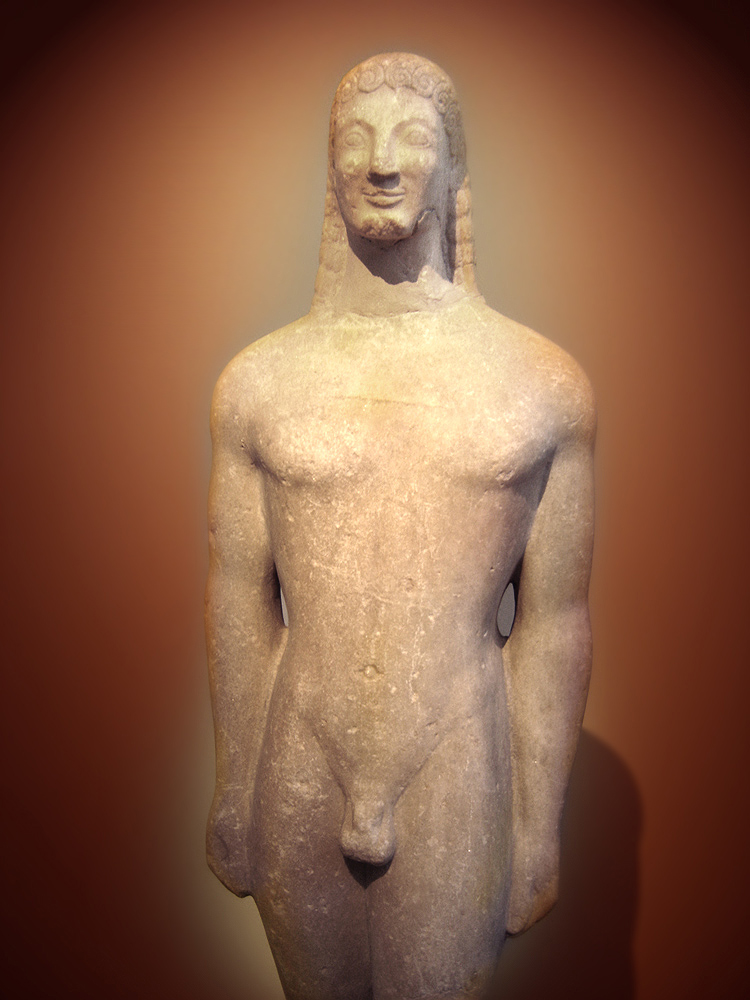
Kouros from Thera.

=== Tenea–Volomandra group ===
C. 575–550 BCE: named after an Attic kouros found at Volomandra and a Corinthian specimen from Tenea (Munich 168) this period marks the flowering of the Middle Archaic, and these kouroi are contemporary with such works as the Berlin Standing Kore, the Moschophoros and the Bluebeard Pediment. There is a tension observable in this group between the solid, architectonic quality of early styles and the expressive possibilities of a vigorous, fluid naturalism . The anatomical novelties of this time are as follows. The ear is carved in more than one plane. A roundness of the eye is indicated henceforth. Lips curve upwards and meet more or less at corners, the upper lip protrudes over lower. Construction of neck is generalized, sterno-mastoids when indicated are marked by slightly modelled shapes. On the median line a groove along sternum is generally replaced by modelled shapes and only the linea alba is marked by only a groove. The lower boundary of thorax assumes the shape of a somewhat rounded arch. There is a slight indication of the external oblique bulging over the iliac crest. Shoulder blades are indicated as modelled shapes. The erector spinae is sometimes modelled. Size of thumb is normal. The vastus internus descends lower than vastus externus. Shins curve inwards. The external malleolus is lower and further back than the internal one. The little toes slant inwards. The metatarsal bones are lightly indicated.

The absolute chronology of this period is provided by the dedication of Rhombos on the Moschophoros, which may belong to the same time as a decree referring to the Panathenaia of 566. The Moschophoros is stylistically similar to early in this group giving us an approximate upper limit of 570. Additionally the terracotta kneeling boy found in a well in the Agora and dated by its black-figure pottery sherd stratum to circa 550 shares the flat almond eyes, absence of the trapezium and pointed arch of the lower thorax that characterizes the late Tenea-Volomandra, furnishing us with a tentative lower boundary for the style.

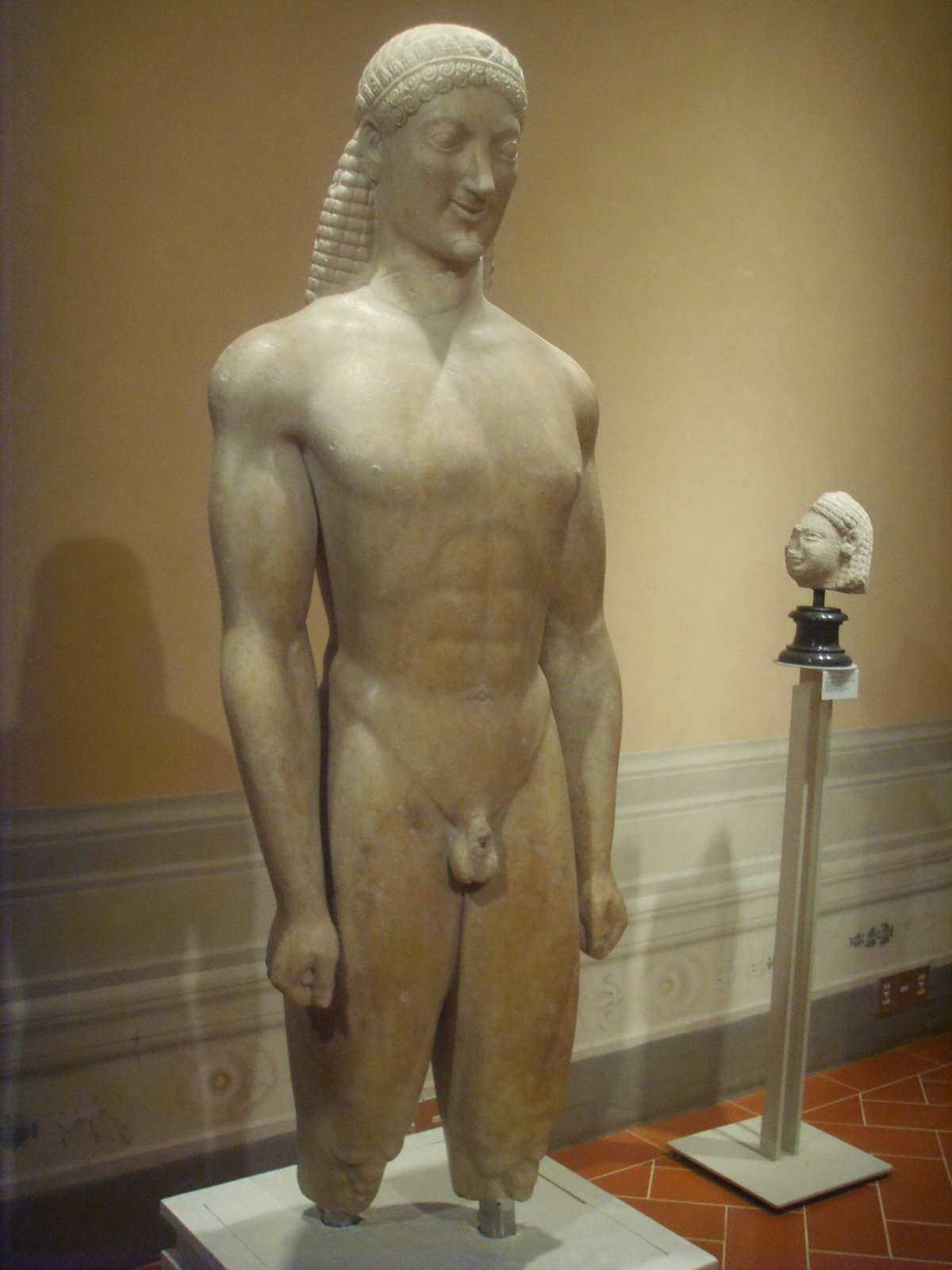
Milani kouros, Florence Museo Archeologico, Richter (1960).

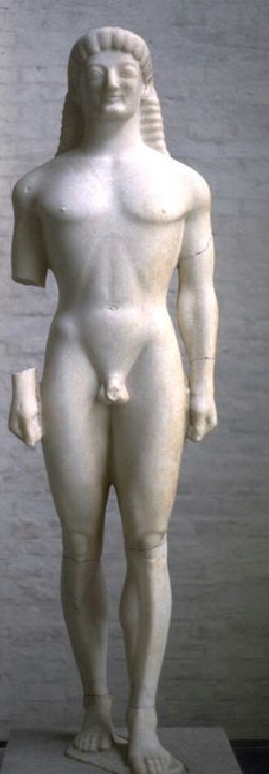
Tenea kouros, Munich 168.

=== Melos group ===
C. 555–540 BCE: figures of this period are simpler than before; their muscles are no longer separately accentuated. There is a tendency to flowing contour and a generalization of form. The tragus now sometimes assumes its natural form. The anterior part of the helix, which is directed backwards (crus helicis), is often prominent, and joined with the upper end of tragus. The antitragus is sometimes tentatively indicated, though wrongly placed. The anterior triangle of the neck is now better understood. Navel generally modelled as a depression. Indication of external oblique bulging over iliac crest. The lower boundary of abdomen occasionally forms a deep curve. Forearm and arm sometimes correctly semi-pronated; both directed towards body. Arms sometimes arched towards body below the armpit. Big toe projects a little further or same as second toe. Four smaller toes and toe nails curve gently downwards.

"Astonishingly uniform" the products of this period are found across the Greek world in large quantities. This group is named after the best preserved example of the era. The date of this group is conjectured on the basis that one generation would be required for the development of the Melos group style prior to the more securely dated Anavysos-Ptoon style. However Richter argues there may be some relationship to other contemporary Greek art works, namely: the figures on Late Corinthian pottery c. 550 BCE. exhibit the same degree of naturalism, and the archaic column sculptures from the Temple of Artemis Ephesos, thought to have been supplied by Croesus of Lydia, share some anatomical features. (Note: Herodotus I.92 claims Croesus supplied the columns; that the fragments that remain in the present day are the same as those Hetrodotus saw is unclear, see Pryce (1928) Richter (1960)) Of the important works that come done to us there is the colossal kouros from Megara, a transitional early piece from Boeotia (Thebes 3) and an early Parian example.

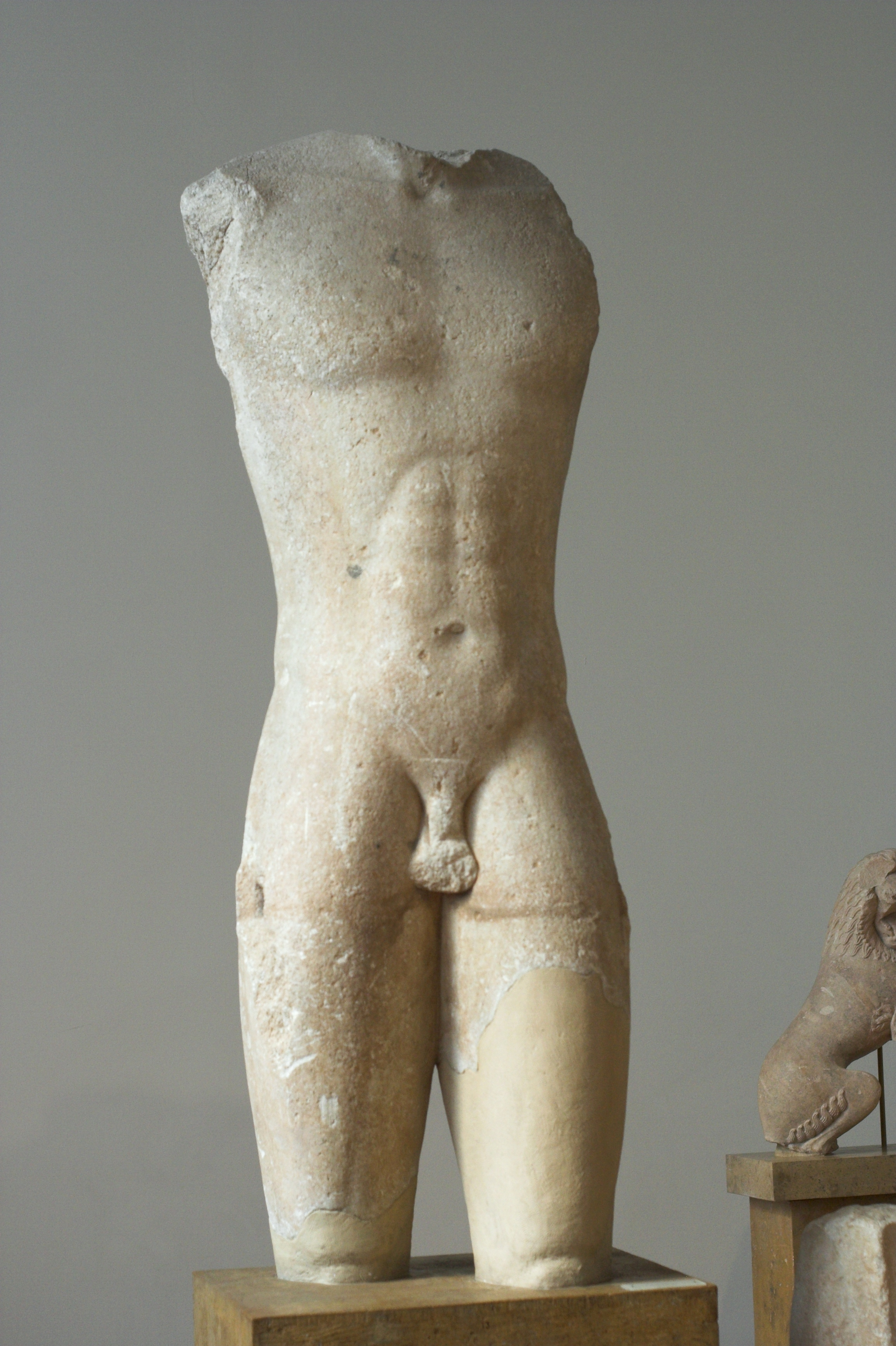
Kouros from Megara

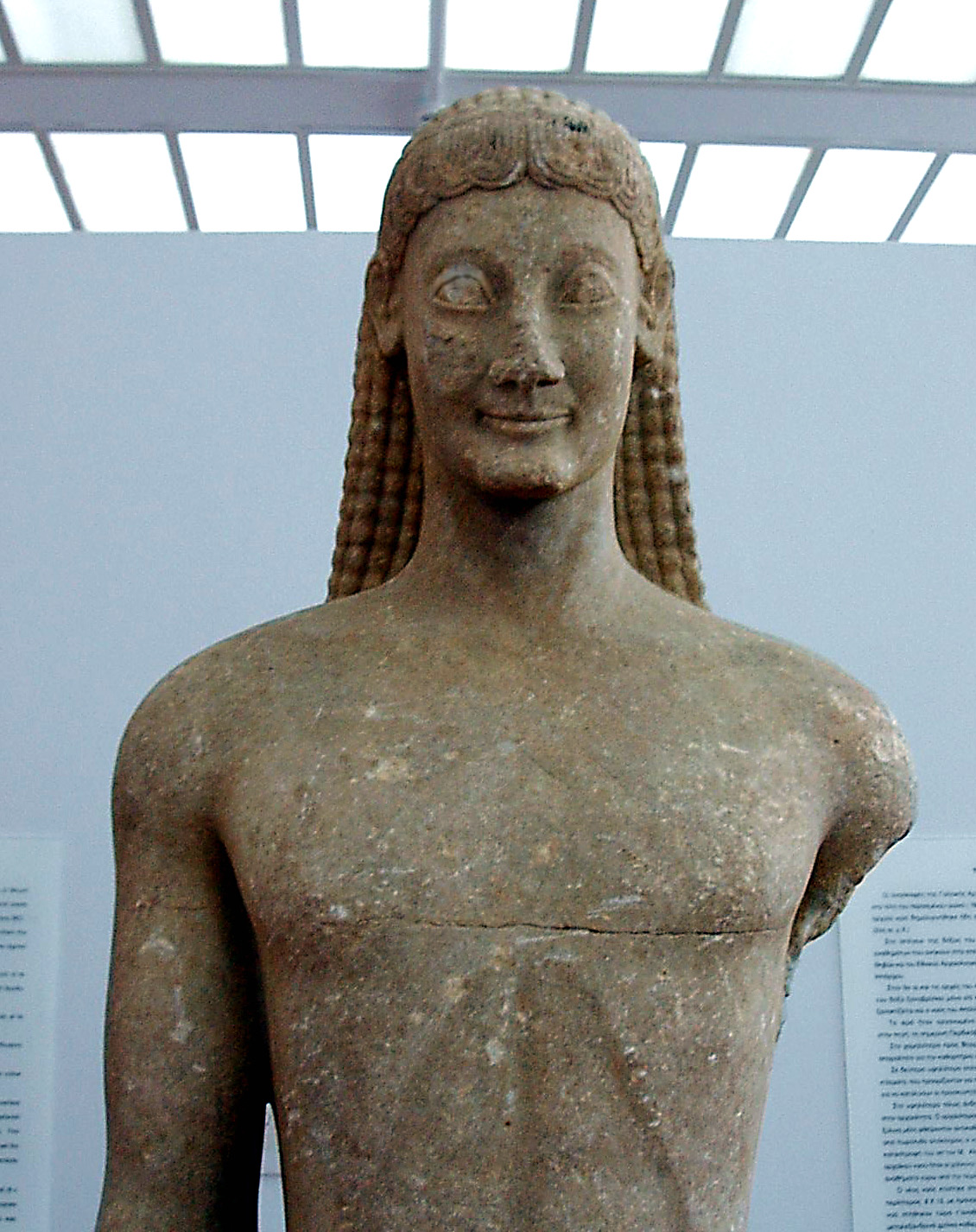
Thebes 3.

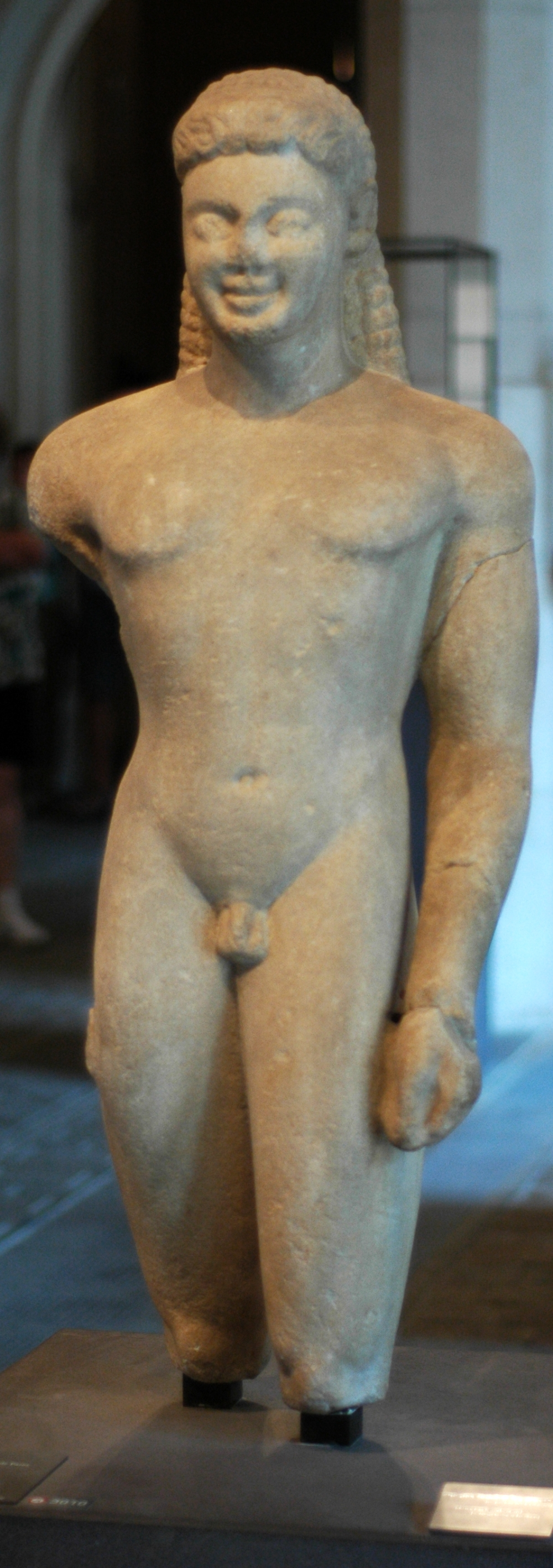
Asclepieion kouros, Louvre

=== Anavysos–Ptoon 12 group ===
C. 540–520 BCE: this is the era of the Peisistratos dynasty and marks the assumption of Athens as the centre of artistic activity in Greece. In this period of great development the anatomical proportions become normal, the forms modelled and the spine clearly S-shaped. The head is now spherical and well-developed. The tragus takes on its natural form, the antitragus is also indicated. Hair occasionally descends as far as nape of neck. The sterno-mastoids when marked are indicated by modelled shapes. Their attachment to sternum and clavicles is often not indicated, this results in a continuous hollow groove or run above the clavicle. There is an attempt to indicate the backward curve of clavicle. Groove along linea alba is sometimes continued below the navel. The lower boundary of thorax arch is indicated. In the flanks the swelling of the external part is well developed. Lower boundary of abdomen assumes shape of small semicircle or deep curve. The erector spinae always indicated as modelled shape. Generally hand and forearm is semi-pronated. Hands are no longer attached to body but joined by short supports. The metacarpal bones are sometimes indicated. The bulge of the vastus internus increases. Toes are no longer parallel but do not recede along a continuous curve. Toes and nails point upwards. The articulation of joints is well rendered. Sometimes the flank of the advanced leg is placed forward and higher than receding leg.

The characteristics of this group can be observed on the Siphnian Treasury which is dated on external evidence before 525 BCE, therefore allowing time for the maturation of the style we can date the beginning of this group to, roughly, a generation prior. The earliest is perhaps the Munich kouros (Glyptothek 169) judging by the rendering of some of the muscles. Another significant Attic kouros in this style is the Anavyssos; its base reads: Stand and mourn Kroisos, first in line of battle and whom Ares [the god of war] killed. Two others are the Akropolis torso, and the Rayet head. The island of Keos supplies us with one of the best examples of the time, notable for its advanced rendering of the back where the greatest protrusion of the back is level with that of the chest. Keos was likely under the cultural influence of Athens at this time and this kouros is comparable to and chronologically close to the Anavyssos kouros and akropolis head. From the Ptoan sanctuary in Boeotia we have the Ptoon 12 kouros (NAMA), "softer, less sturdy", Richter (1960). suggests; Richter asserts it is a local Boeotian product, not an import from Athens.

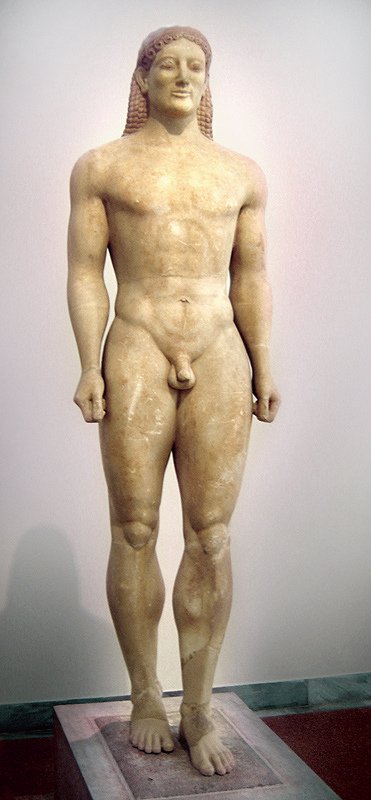
Anavysos Kouros.

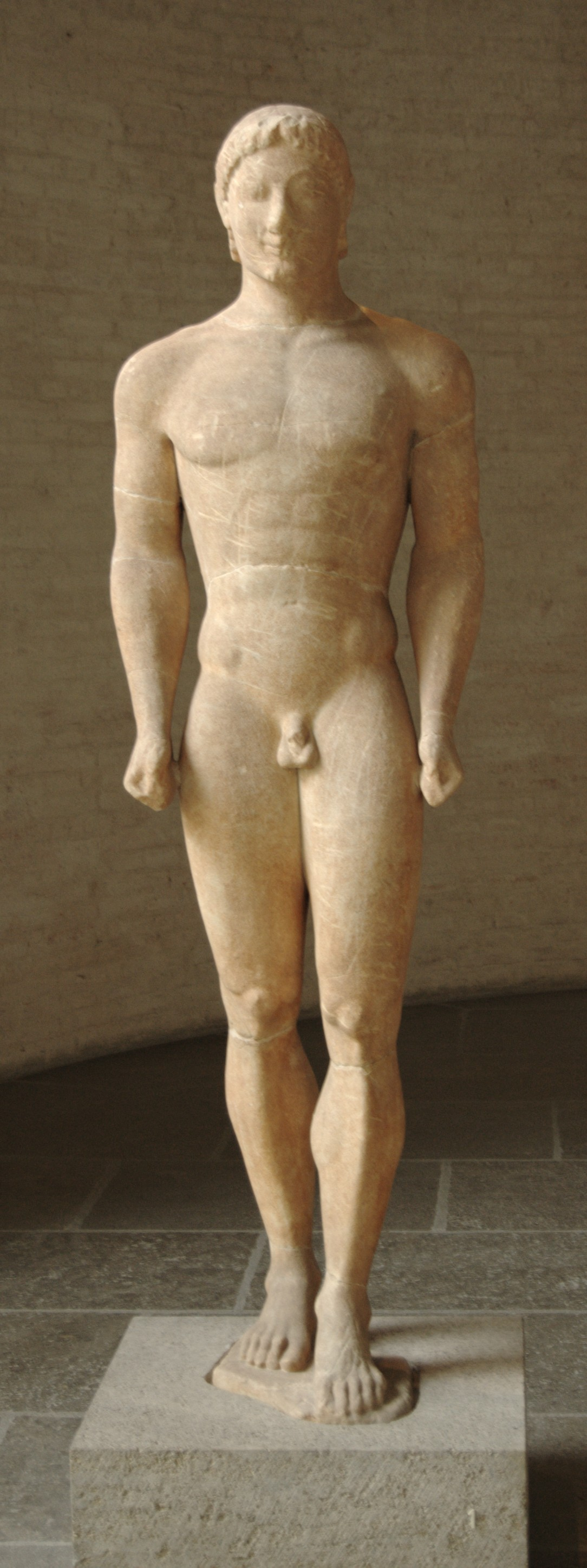
Munich Kouros

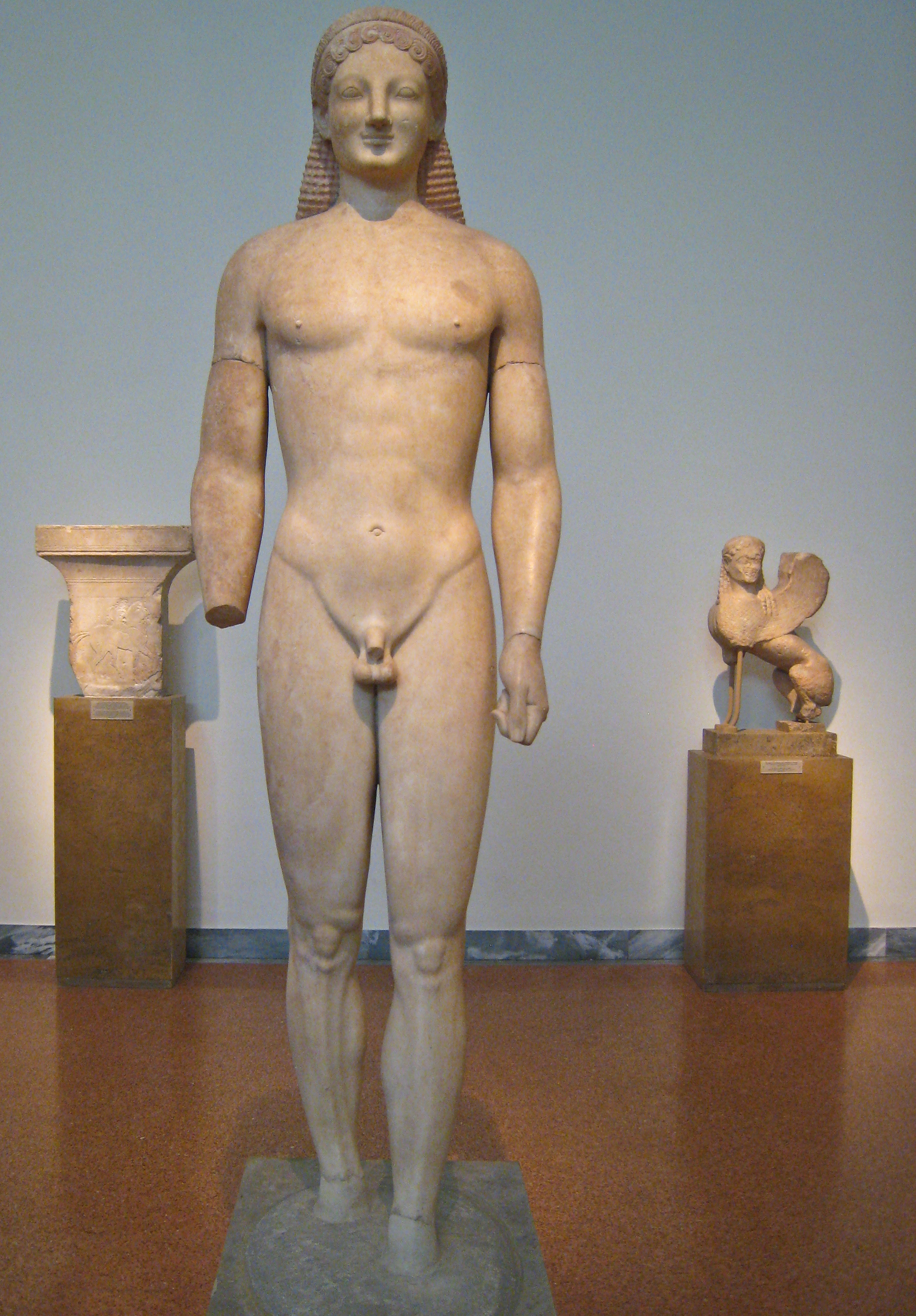
Athens, Kouros from Merenda.

=== Ptoon 20 group ===
C. 520–485 BCE: the last stage in the development of the kouros type is the period in which the Greek sculptor attained a full knowledge of human anatomy and used it to create a harmonious, proportionate whole. The features that now become expressed are as follows. The lachrymal caruncle is sometimes indicated. Lips curved upwards only in early examples, the upper lip protrudes markedly over the lower and lips are well shaped. Hair is generally short or rolled up behind, it radiates from a point near vertex and carved in wavy strands. The structure of neck is now correct. There is an indication of swelling of trapezium on the outline of shoulder, becoming more pronounced over time. Clavicles assume an s-shape and lose themselves in shoulders. The lower boundary of thorax assumes a semicircular arch. The rectus abdominis, now reduced in number to two, with the top one incorporated into lower boundary of thorax. There is a small raised plane caused by projection of xiphoid appendage sometimes observable at lower end of sternum. Navel has fold of skin above in most examples. The lower boundary of abdomen assumes shape of semicircle, and the upper edge of torso with two concave curves becomes regular in form. Forearm and hand correctly pronated. Arms sometimes held free from body. Flanks; occasionally at first later regularly, flank and buttock of supporting leg rise in conformity with action.

This period is framed by the stasis of the Peisistratid era and the beginning of Athenian democracy and the Persian war. The upper limit of this group may be fixed by the sculpture of the temple of Apollo, Delphi. Architecturally earlier than the Hekatompedon of Athens the Delphi temple has a probable date of c. 520 BCE, thus the kouroi of its pediment which betray the swelling trapezium and semicircular lower boundary of the abdomen can be associated with later examples of the group. Yet these same youths have a grooved, narrow lower boundary to the thorax and their flanks are level, suggesting that they are early specimens of the style. Richter (1960) names this group after the kouros Ptoon 20, which is likely a Boeotian work dedicated by Pythias of Akraiphia and Aischrion to Apollo of the silver bow. (Note: Though other origins have been suggested, see Deonna) This along with the torso form Eutresis (Thebes 7) indicate a vigorous Boeotian school of sculpture which may have existed to serve the Ptoan sanctuary. Attic production is considerable up to c. 500 BCE after which it seems to peter out. Important late kouroi from Athens include the Aristodikos kouros (Ptoon 20 group) an akropolis statuette and the bronze Apollo from Piraeus.

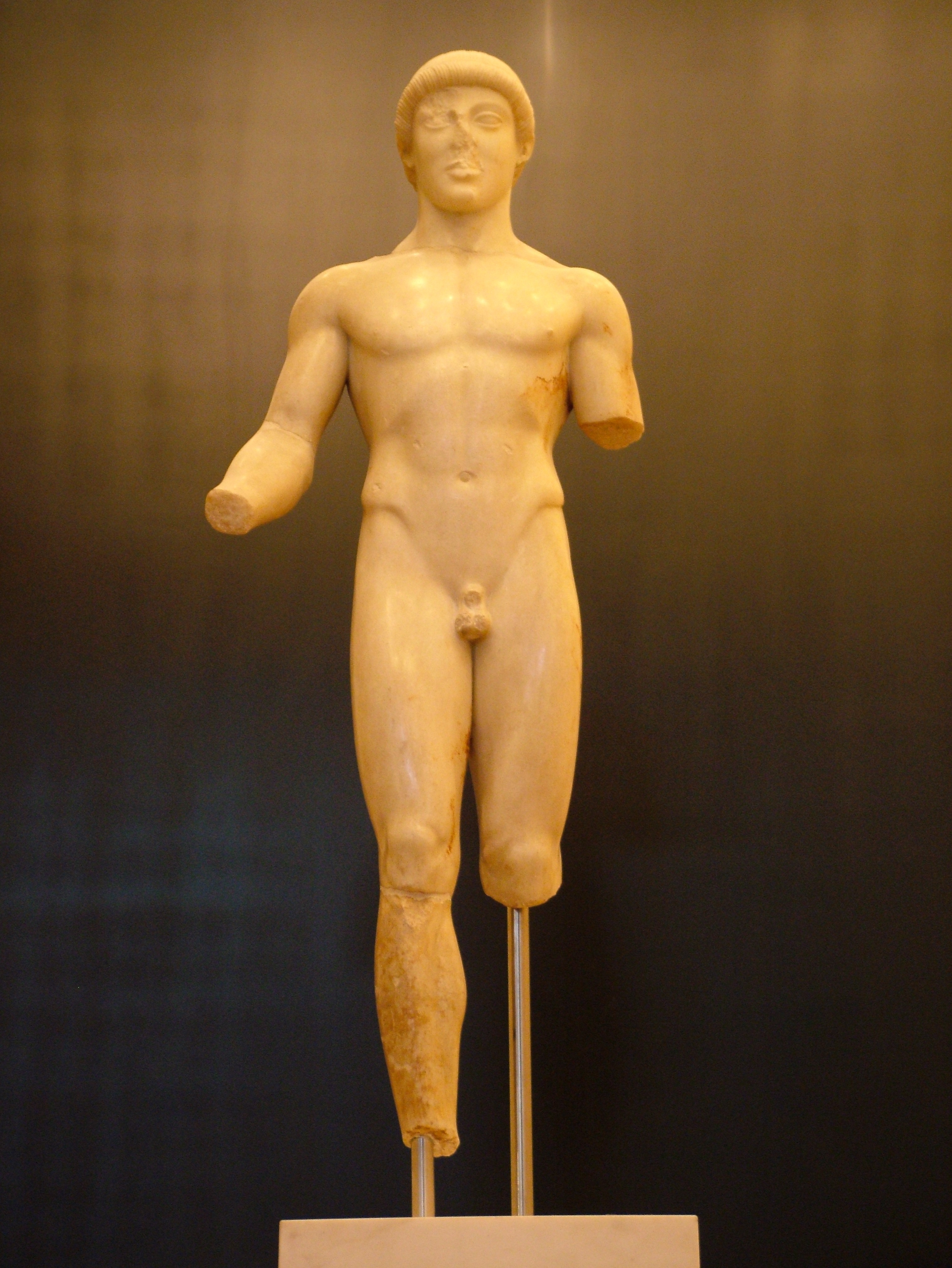
Agrigento ephebe, Richter (1960).

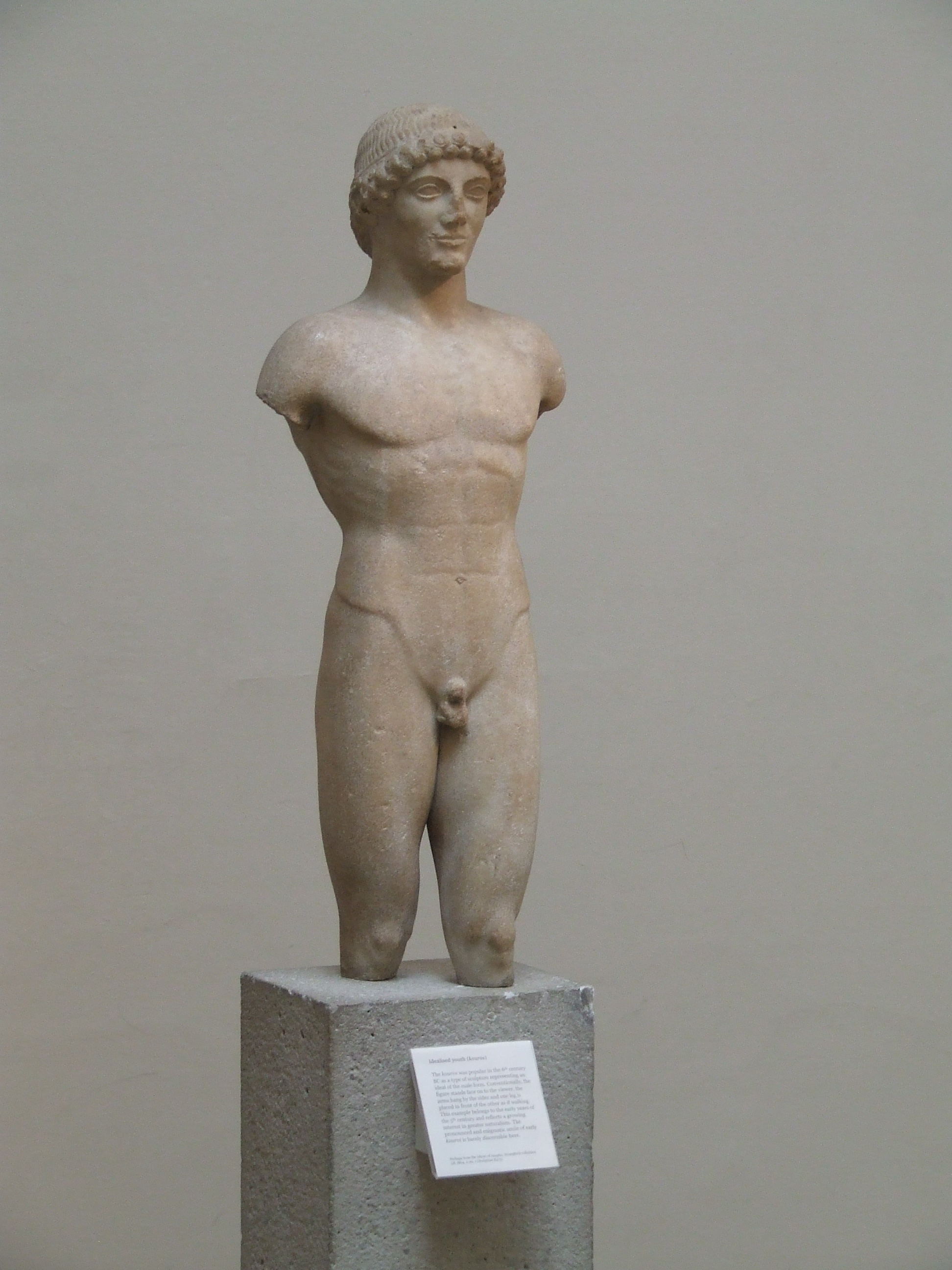
B.M.London, from Anaphe (?).

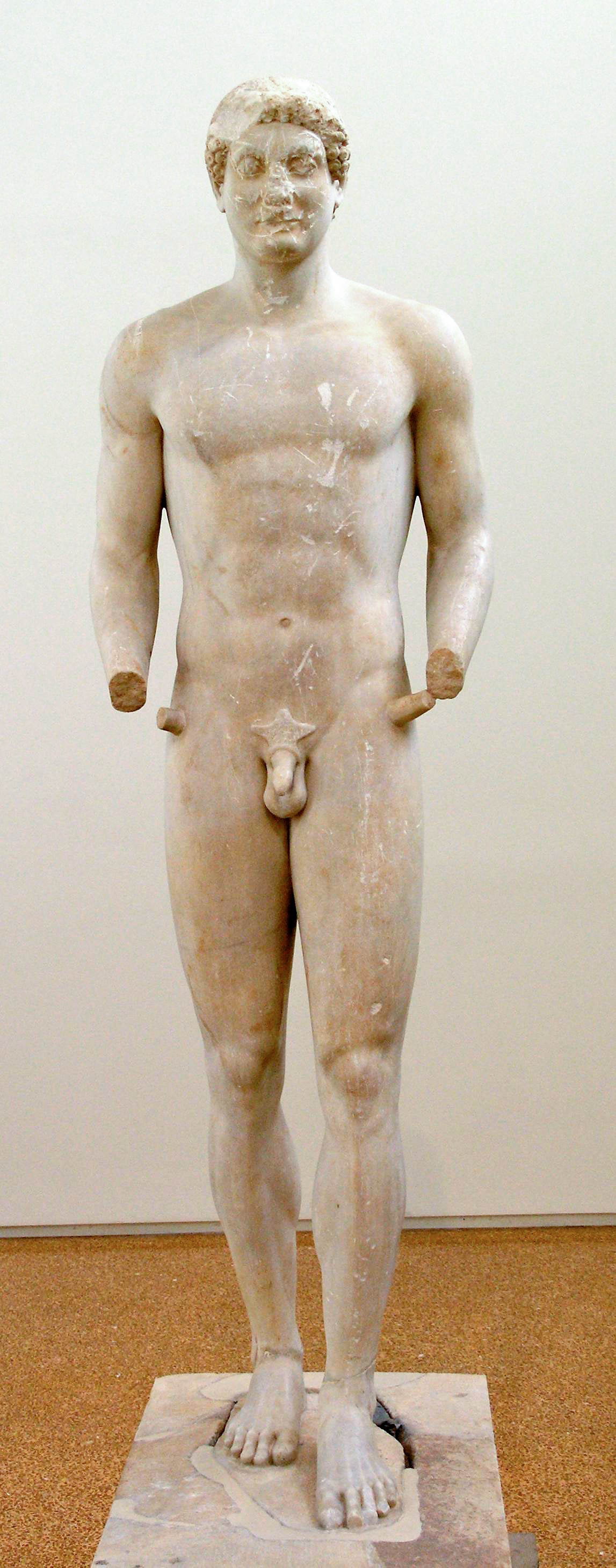
Late Athenian Aristodikos Kouros

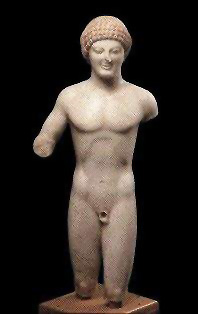
Kouros of Reggio, Calabria.

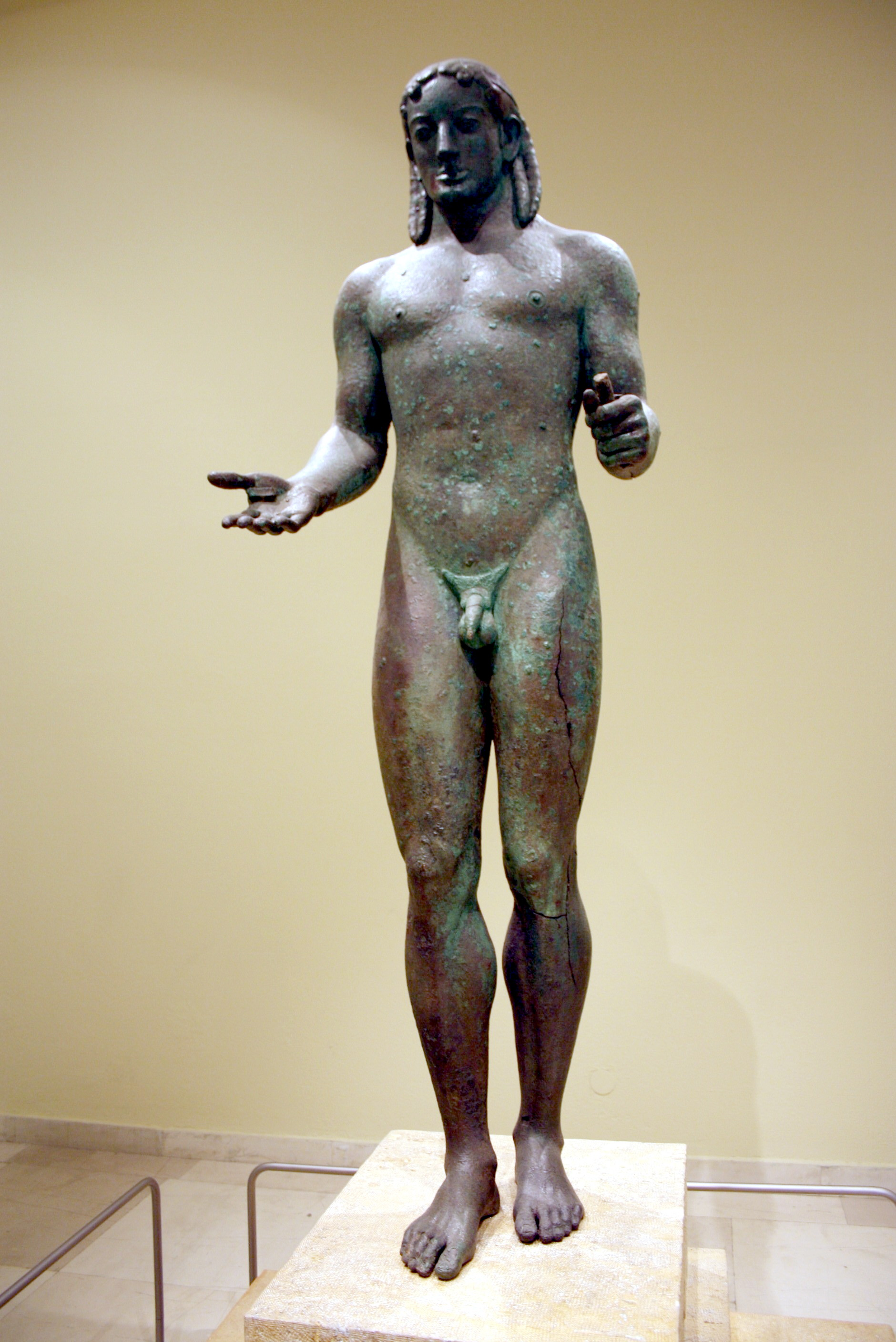
Piraeus Apollo

== See also ==
- Ephebos
- Getty kouros
- Greek art
- List of museums in Greece
- National Archaeological Museum of Athens
- Rampin Rider
- Strangford Apollo

== Sources ==
- Boardman, J. (1991). Greek Sculpture: The Archaic period, a handbook.
- Buschor, E. (1950). Frühgriechische Jünglinge.
- Caskey, L.D. (1924). "The Proportions of the Apollo of Tenea". American Journal of Archaeology. 28 (4): 358–367. doi:10.2307/497537. JSTOR 497537. S2CID 191402227.
- Deonna, W. (1909). Les 'Apollons Archaïques', étude sur le type masculin de la statuaire greque au VI^{me} siècle avant notre ère (in French).
- Guralnick, Eleanor (July 1985). "Profiles of Kouroi". American Journal of Archaeology. 89 (3): 399–409. doi:10.2307/504356. JSTOR 504356. S2CID 193093189.
- Guralnick, E. (1978). "The Proportions of Kouroi". American Journal of Archaeology. 82 (4): 461–472. doi:10.2307/504635. JSTOR 504635.
- Richter, Gisela M.A. (1963). A Handbook of Greek Art (Third ed.).
- Richter, Gisela M.A. (1960). Kouroi, Archaic Greek Youths: A study of the development of the Kouros type in Greek sculpture.
- Ridgway, B.S. (1977). The Archaic Style in Greek Sculpture (1st ed.).
- Ridgway, B.S. (1993). The Archaic Style in Greek Sculpture (2nd ed.).
- Stewart, A. (1990). Greek Sculpture.
- Franssen, J. (2011). Votiv und Repräsentation. Statuarische Weihungen archaischer Zeit aus Samos und Attika. Archäologie und Geschichte (in German). Vol. Bd. 13. Heidelberg, DE: Verlag Archäologie und Geschichte. ISBN 978-3-935289-36-8.
