= Munich Kouros =

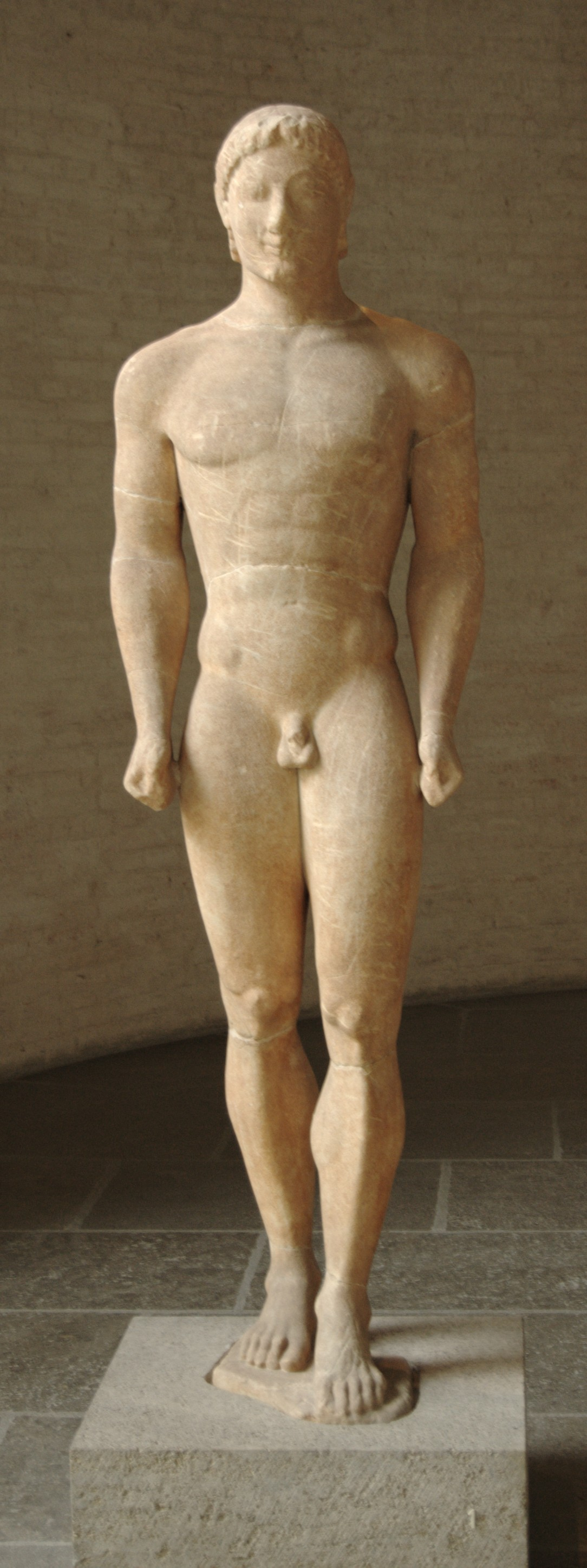
Munich Kouros

The large, grave statue of a youth from Attica known as the Munich Kouros is located in the Glyptothek in Munich, Germany, under inventory number 169. The Kouros was acquired by the Glyptothek in 1910.

== History ==
The Munich kouros is one of the earliest examples of the Ptoon 12 group, and therefore dates to around a decade before the creation of the Siphnian Treasury frieze in 525 BC. It originally stood in Athens, but was taken down and buried relatively soon after – perhaps in 480 BC by the Persian army during the destruction of Athens. After its rediscovery, it was acquired in 1910 by the Munich Glyptothek. It was said to have been unearthed in Attica.

== Description ==
The Munich kouros is made of Parian marble, and is 2.08 metres high (2.11 m including the plinth). The surface of the stone has been stained red-brown from being buried in iron-rich soil. The statue with its heavy proportions and the short hair portrays an athletic ideal.

The face is full and round-oval, and in the side view it reaches a depth unknown in older statues. The archaic smile typical of statues of the time, plays around the lips. The eyes are almond-shaped and, in contrast to older statues, the ears are realistically reproduced. The face is framed by three-dimensional, hanging spiral curls that split over the middle of the forehead, unlike earlier kouroi which have shoulder-length hair.

The broad shoulders are on the same level. The freely worked out arms hang down parallel to the body, the forearms are angled slightly forward, the hands clenched into fists. Only in the area of the inside of the fist were the forearms connected to the body by means of small marble bridges. The treatment of the back, with its schematic furrows which indicate different muscle parts running from the backbone to the flanks as well as the shoulder blades, is based on older models.

The left leg is placed forward, the right step back slightly, without reproducing a motive for movement. The position of the legs hardly affects the design of the pelvis, which only imperceptibly indicates that the left side is raised or the right is lowered.

Due to its stylistic features, the kouros is dated around 540–30 BC. He is close to the Kroisos Kouros, who also comes from Attica.

== Bibliography ==
- Richter, Gisela M. A. (1960). Kouroi, Archaic Greek Youths. A Study of the Development of the Kouros Type in Greek Sculpture. London: Phaidon.
- Wünsche, Raimund (2007). Glyptothek, Munich: Masterpieces of Greek and Roman Sculpture. C.H. Beck.
