= Strangford Apollo =

Ancient Greek sculpture

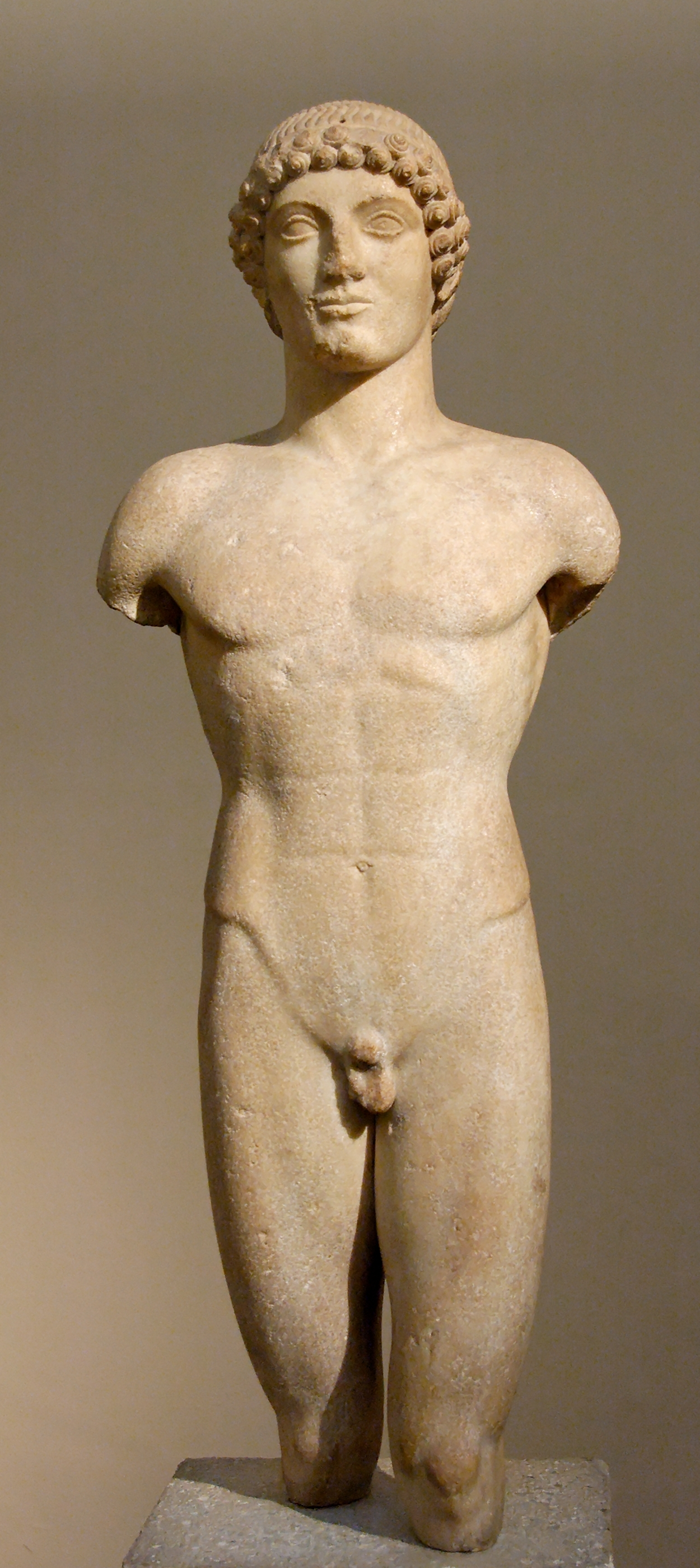
- Material: Marble
- Height: 1.01 metres (3.3 ft)
- Created: c. 490 BCE
- Discovered: Anafi, Greece (believed)
- Present location: British Museum
- Registration: 1864,0220.1

The Strangford Apollo is an ancient Greek sculpture of a nude boy, with the arms and lower legs missing. It dates to around 490 BC, making it one of the latest examples of the kouros type of statue, and is made of Parian marble. Its provenance is uncertain: it is generally believed to have been made on the island of Aegina and discovered on Anafi. It may originally have been a cult statue, or possibly a temple dedication.

The sculpture has been in British Museum's collection since 1864, when Charles Thomas Newton purchased it for the Museum from the collection of Percy Smythe, 8th Viscount Strangford, who had acquired it in the 1820s during the Greek War of Independence. It was used as a model for the face of the "Colossus of Leone", a colossal statue built as a prop for Sergio Leone's 1961 film The Colossus of Rhodes.

== Ancient history ==
The Strangford Apollo was made from Parian marble around 490 BCE, (Note: Jerome Pollitt dates it to "490 or 485 BCE". A minority view, put forward by Michaela Fuchs, dates the statue to the first century BCE and argues that its features are consciously archaising: in a review of Fuchs's work, Kim Hartswick called this argument "a house of cards ... that cannot support the conclusions proposed.") and stands 1.01 metres (3.3 ft) tall. It depicts a nude standing youth in the kouros style. The lower parts of the legs and arms are missing. It is generally believed to have been found on the island of Anafi, though has also been suggested as having been discovered on Lemnos: one or both of these attributions were made by Charles Thomas Newton, the Keeper of Greek and Roman Antiquities in the British Museum, though the evidence on which he based his judgement is now lost.

The statue is generally considered to have originated from the island of Aegina, partly due to similarities between it and figures depicted on the pediments of the island's Temple of Aphaia: this hypothesis was first suggested by Heinrich Brunn and has generally been accepted since, though in the twentieth century Ernst Buschor has suggested that it may have been made in Boeotia, and Ernst Langlotz that it was made on a Greek island. It may have been the cult statue of the island's temple of Apollo Aigletes, or alternatively been offered as a dedication at the temple: equally, the statue may predate the construction of the temple.

The Strangford Apollo is one of the latest known examples of the kouros type, which originated in the seventh century BCE, during the Archaic period of Greek art. Jerome Pollitt has written that it shows "the outward humanisation which characterised much late Archaic sculpture", and that it follows a more naturalistic canon of proportions than most earlier kouroi.

== Modern history ==
The statue is believed to have been acquired by Percy Smythe, 8th Viscount Strangford, a British ambassador to the Sublime Porte in Constantinople between 1820 and 1825, in the 1820s, early in the Greek War of Independence. It was purchased by the British Museum in 1864, from a collection which had been made by Strangford before his death in 1855. Newton discovered the statue in Strangford's cellar, and purchased it for the museum.

The sculptor Ramiro Gómez used the face of the Strangford Apollo for that of the "Colossus of Leone", a colossal statue built as a prop for Sergio Leone's 1961 film The Colossus of Rhodes, after Leone's wish to give the statue the face of Benito Mussolini was rejected.

== See also ==
- Moschophoros

== Bibliography ==
- Badoud, Nathan (2024). The Colossus of Rhodes: Archaeology of a Lost Wonder. Oxford University Press. ISBN 978-0-19-890373-4.
- Greenhalgh, Michael (2019). Plundered Empire: Acquiring Antiquities from Ottoman Lands. Leiden: Brill. ISBN 978-90-04-40547-9.
- Hartswick, Kim J. (2000). "Review: In hoc genere Graeciae nihil cedamus: Studien zur Romanisierung der Späthellenistischen Kunst im 1. J.h. v. Chr., by Michaela Fuchs". American Journal of Archaeology. 104 (4): 811–812. JSTOR 507175.
- Kenna, Margaret E. (2009). "Apollo and the Virgin: The Changing Meanings of a Sacred Site on Anafi". History & Anthropology. 20 (4): 487–509. doi:10.1080/02757200903298500. S2CID 161877737.
- McNeal, R. A. (1967). "Anaphe: Home of the Strangford Apollo". Archaeology. 20 (4): 254–263. JSTOR 41667762.
- Osborne, Robin (2018). The Transformation of Athens: Painted Pottery and the Creation of Classical Greece. Princeton University Press. ISBN 978-0-691-17767-0.
- Pollitt, Jerome J. (1972). Art and Experience in Classical Greece. Cambridge University Press. OCLC 1028186267 – via Internet Access.
- Smith, Arthur Hamilton (1892). A Catalogue of Sculpture in the Department of Greek and Roman Antiquities, British Museum. Vol. 1. London: Trustees of the British Museum. OCLC 50251709.
- Walter-Karydi, Elena (2024). The Athenians and Their Graves (1000–300 BC). Berlin: De Gruyter. ISBN 978-3-11-071634-4.
