= Sounion Kouros =

Ancient Greek colossal statue

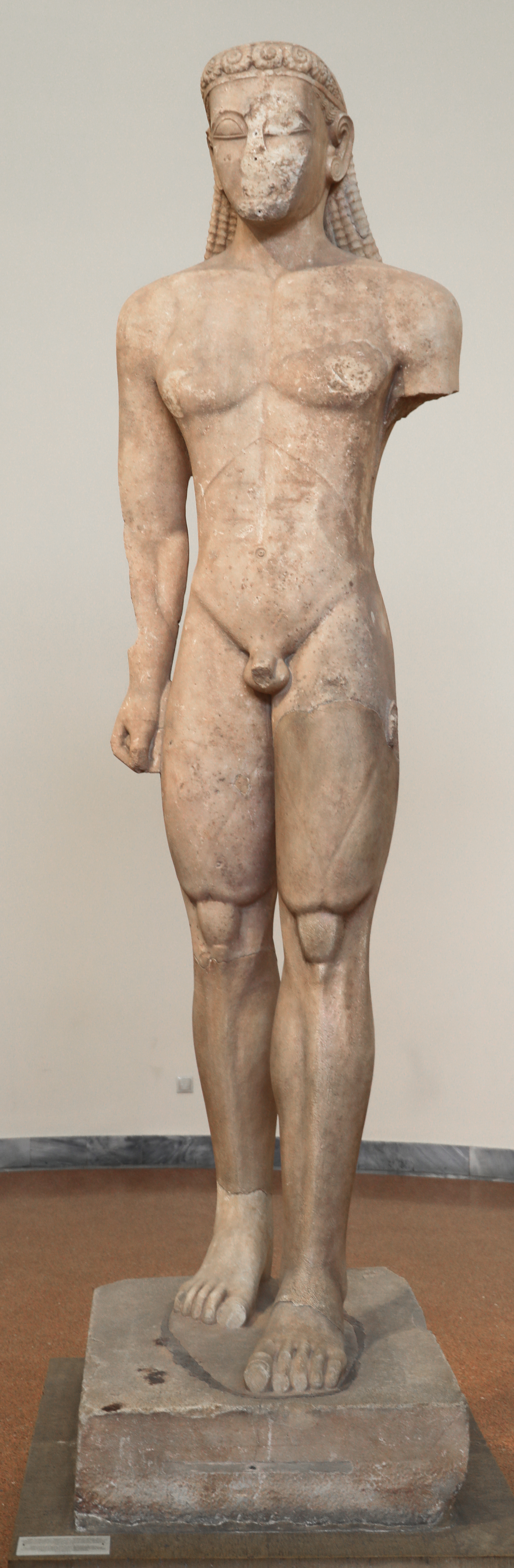
Sounion Kouros (c. 600 BCE) at the National Archaeological Museum of Athens.

The Sounion Kouros is an early archaic Greek statue of a naked young man or kouros (Ancient Greek κοῦρος, plural kouroi) carved in marble from the island of Naxos around 600 BCE. It is one of the earliest examples that scholars have of the kouros-type which functioned as votive offerings to gods or demi-gods, and were dedicated to heroes. Found near the Temple of Poseidon at Cape Sounion, this kouros was found badly damaged and heavily weathered. It was restored to its original height of 3.05 meters (10.0 ft) returning it to its larger than life size. It is now held by the National Archaeological Museum of Athens.

Ancient Greeks were influenced by their Egyptian neighbors when creating kouroi. The Egyptian influence is especially evident in the pose of the figure. Archaic sculptors intended to idealize the human form which is made evident by the modeling of the Sounion Kouros. Sculptors of kouri attempted to convey slight movement and more naturalism over the course of the 6th century BCE.

== Influences ==
Ancient Greeks were heavily influenced by Egyptian ka statues which were figures intended to provide a resting place for the spirit, or ka, of the deceased. This influence is most evident in large-scale wooden statues, or xoana, from Ancient Greece. Kouroi share similarities with Egyptian ka statues, including the frontal stance, arms by the sides and advanced left leg. For example, the Pythian Apollo at Megara, Herakles at Erythrai, and the first Apollo Lykios look very much Egyptian. Although Egyptian influence is evident, the kouros-type show differences from Egyptian works. The male youth of the Sounion kouros, for example, is nude as he does not wear a skirt, and is free-standing without a supporting structure.

== Function ==
The Sounion Kouros is an early example of Greek kouroi which were used as votive offerings to gods and demi-gods, and dedicated to heroes in hero cults. Kouroi were sometimes intended to represent a mortal or hero and sometimes intended to represent a god or demi-god. They were dedicated as votive offerings in sanctuaries and used as memorial markers in a funerary context. It is probable that the Sounion kouros served as a votive offering to Poseidon as it was found near the Temple of Poseidon at Cape Sounion.

== Form ==
The figure stands in the conventional pose of this "extremely uniform style of early Greek sculpture." The stiff body faces frontally, with fists clenched by its thighs, and its wide shoulders contrasting the narrow waist and hips. The shoulders and hips are stable. Although the left foot is advanced, the figure's weight is distributed equally on both feet. The body and head are aligned creating balance and symmetry. Fixed to a cylindrical neck, the head is large and square. The face is flat and the lips curve into an archaic smile. Some details are abstracted: the figure has large volute earlobes, oversized almond-shaped eyes, and elongated proportions. When looking at the sides of the face, one can see that "the distance from the cheeks to the temples is disproportionately large."

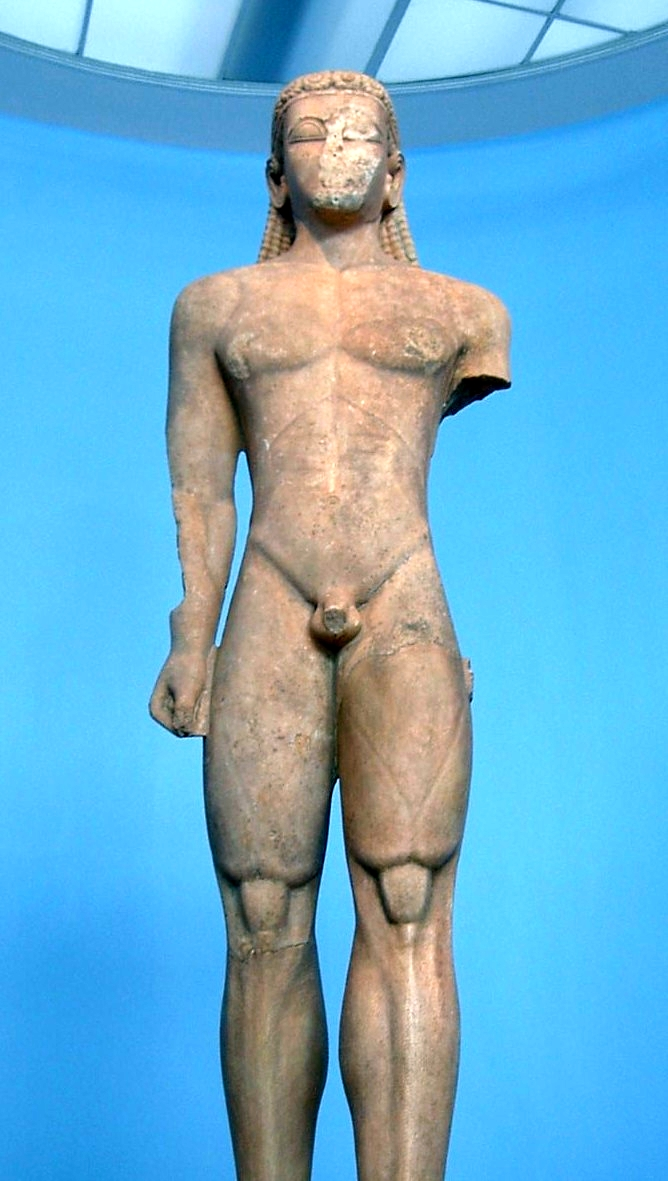
Up close look at the modeling of the Sounion Kouros

Some red coloring remains in the strands of braided hair. The hair pattern creates a row of shell-like curls which start on the forehead and hang down the statue's back. The hair is tied with a double ribbon in a Heracles knot.

The figure is extensively modeled creating harsh contour lines especially on the knees and abdomen. The muscles are "rendered by grooves, with a decorative intent that is carried to the point of excess and stylisation." The inguinal ligament which creates a triangle shape in the lower abdomen is strongly modeled. Grooves on the abdomen suggest two more abdominal muscles than what is anatomically correct.

=== Idealization ===
In Ancient Greece, idealized figures were simultaneously considered beautiful and to represent strong morality and a virtuous nature. Idealized sculptures were pleasing to both the eyes of humans and the gods so they were used as offerings. As it was found near the Temple of Poseidon, it is probable that the Sounion Kouros was considered a beautiful votive offering for the pleasure of the god. The Sounion Kouros is idealized as it was the intent of the artist "to convey an ideal of the human form – one that subscribes to a number of stylised and formal patterns than its real-life, physical or natural appearance." Sculpted in the beginning of the 6th century BC, the Sounion Kouros is representative of Archaic sculptors' shift to render naturalistic figures: "That interest in pattern and symmetry is characteristic of Archaic sculpture, although it gives way to the apparent attempt to imitate the natural form of the human body during the course of the sixth century BCE."

Greek men wore nudity as a costume when they were aspiring to be associated with the ideal, elite, aristocratic, or heroic. The kouros-type were offerings to gods and dedicated to heroes so kouroi wore the costume of nudity to symbolize the heroic sentiment, a concept referred to as Heroic nudity. The Sounion Kouros was an offering to Poseidon so it probably displays heroic nudity as well.

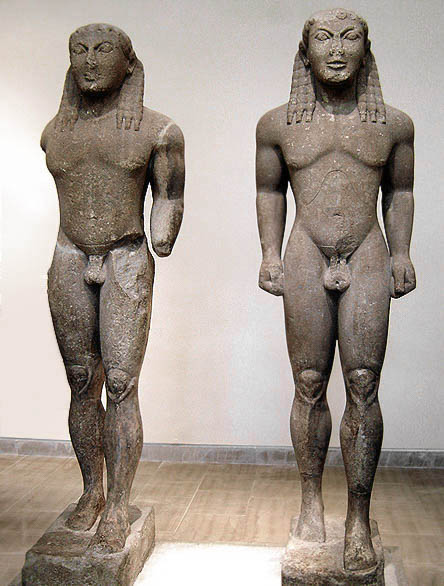
The statue-pair of Kleobis and Biton, ca. 570 BCE

=== Movement ===
Traces of the sculptor's desire to create movement can be extrapolated although the figure appears to be perfectly stable. First, Archaic sculptors neither possessed or valued an acute sense of proportion, so they equated great size to great movement. The size of the legs in relation to the size of waist could have conveyed movement in the Sounion Kouros. The figure can be compared to the Assos reliefs which display a "disparity between the size of the waist and leg as an attempt to express expanded muscles." Second, if the movement was simple, an early Archaic sculptor would choose to represent those factors "according to his instinct, experience, and judgment, he deems most widely characteristic of that movement and most easily apprehended."

A single advanced leg is the basic movement which laid the foundation for Greek artists after the Archaic period to convey movement. Although kouroi seems to have a rigid stance "the figure is like a wound-up spring ready for action... Neither standing nor walking, the kouros suggests the perfect 'nimble-footed' or 'swift in knees' readiness of the Homeric hero." For example, in twin kouroi dedicated as funerary monuments to hero brothers Kleobis and Biton in ca 570 BCE "the slightly flexed elbows of the figures seem to recall a tugging motion." According to mythology, the two brothers pulled their mother in a cart for 5 or 6 miles before dying of exhaustion.

== Construction and history ==
Each side of the kouros was carved separately from the other and little attention was given to seamlessly attach them to create a convincingly three-dimensional form.

The statue was found buried near the Temple of Poseidon at Cape Sounion in 1906. It was discovered in a pit with its base alongside fragments of other statues which were all dedicated to Poseidon and probably stood in front of the god's sanctuary. They were most likely left at the site after the destruction of the sanctuary and its votive offerings by the Persians when the temple was destroyed in 480 BC during the second Persian invasion of Greece.

== Current condition ==
The Sounion Kouros has suffered considerable damage and was heavily weathered, probably due to being displayed outdoors. Most of the left leg and the lower right leg below the knee were missing. The left arm below the shoulder and parts of the right arm were missing as well. Lastly, the face was badly chipped.

== Bibliography ==
Mattusch, Carol. Greek Bronze Statuary: From the Beginnings Through the Fifth Century B.C. Ithaca, NY: Cornell University Press, 1988.

Osborne, Robin. Archaic and Classical Greek Art. Oxford, UK: Oxford University Press, 1998: 75–85.

Post, Candler Rathfon. "The Development of Motion in Archaic Greek Sculpture." Harvard Studihes in Classical Philology 20 (1909): 95–164.

Sculpture in the National Archaeological Museum, Athens, edited by Nikolaos Kaltsas, Ethnikon Archaiologikon Mouseion (Greece), p. 39

"Sounion Kouros." University of Cambridge Faculty of Classics. October 2, 2013. Accessed October 4, 2017. https://www.classics.cam.ac.uk/museum/collections/museum-highlights/sounion-kouros.

Spivey, Nigel. Greek Art. London, UK: Phaidon, 1997: 103–168.

Woodford, Susan. An Introduction to Greek Art. Ithaca, NY: Cornell University Press, 1988: 38–56.
