= Kroisos Kouros =

Ancient Greek sculpture

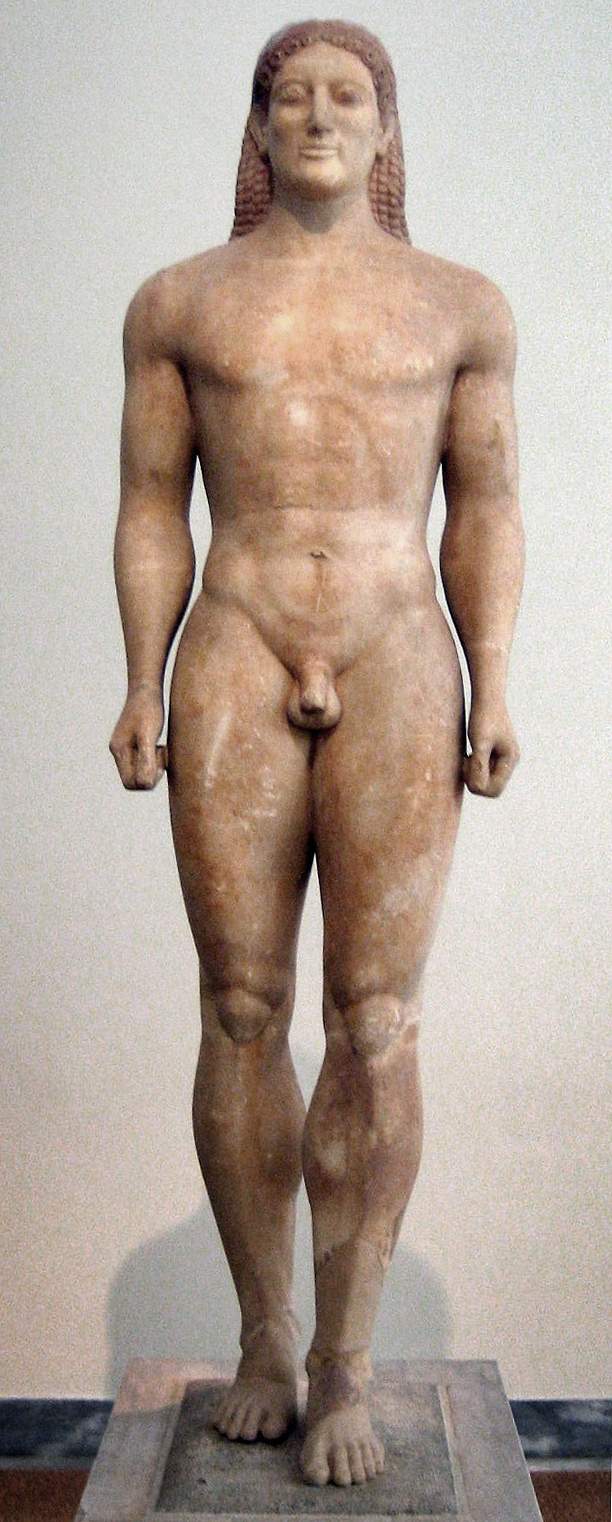
Anavyssos Kouros, ca. 530 BC.

The Kroisos Kouros (Ancient Greek: κοῦρος) is a marble kouros from Anavyssos (Ανάβυσσος) in Attica which functioned as a grave marker for a fallen young warrior named Kroisos (Κροῖσος).

== Overview ==
The free-standing sculpture strides forward with the "archaic smile" playing slightly on his face. The sculpture is dated to the Late Archaic Period c. 540–515 BC and stands 1.95 metres high. It is now situated in the National Archaeological Museum of Athens (inv. no. 3851) in Athens, Greece.

The sculptor of the kouros is uncertain and there is no secure record of the time and location of its discovery. It was identified in Paris in 1937 in the possession of the art dealer M. Roussos. An investigation was launched and reports showed that some years before it had been illegally unearthed from a burial mound in Anavissos in Attica. It was sawn in various parts and sent to Paris for sale before it was returned to the National Archaeological Museum of Athens.

The inscription on the base of the statue reads:

- ΣΤΕΘΙ : ΚΑΙ ΟΙΚΤΙΡΟΝ ΚΡΟΙΣΟ
- ΠΑΡΑ ΣΕΜΑ ΘΑΝΟΝΤΟΣ ΗΟΝ
- ΠΟΤ’ ΕΝΙ ΠΡΟΜΑΧΟΙΣ : ΟΛΕΣΕ
- ΘΟΡΟΣ : ΑΡΕΣ

"Stop and show pity beside the marker of Kroisos, dead, whom, when he was in the front ranks, raging Ares destroyed".

The Kroisos Kouros is central to two ongoing archeological debates: first, whether kouroi represent specific young men or are generic representations of idealised archetypes, which may not actually resemble a specific individual commemorated, and thus represent a symbolic embodiment of the ideal male warriors promachoi (πρόμᾰχοι) who fought in the front line of battles; and second, the authenticity of the Getty kouros, which bears a falsified provenance and displays a suspicious similarity to the Kroisos kouros.
