= Gianfranco Becchina =

Italian antiquities dealer (born 1939)

- Born: 1939 (age 86–87); Castelvetrano
- Occupation: art dealer

Gianfranco Becchina is an Italian antiquities dealer who has been convicted in Italy of illegally dealing in antiquities.

== Early life ==
Gianfranco Becchina was born in 1939 in Sicily. He is also known as Giovanni Franco Becchina.

== Art dealing ==
Becchina owns the gallery Palladion Antike Kunst. Becchina has supplied art objects to the Ashmolean, the Louvre, the Boston Museum of Fine Arts, the Metropolitan Museum of Art, the Princeton University Art Museum, the Toledo Museum of Art and the J. Paul Getty Museum, the collectors George Ortiz, Leon Levy and Shelby White, the Merrin Gallery in New York, Japanese antiquities dealer Noriyoshi Horiuchi, Dietrich von Bothmer of the Metropolitan Museum of Art. He has collaborated with the art dealers Mario Bruno and Elie Borowsky, and sold material through Sotheby's and Christie's auction houses in London. Sometimes he used pseudonymes such as Anna Spinello (the married name of his sister).

== Conviction for art trafficking ==
Becchina was convicted in Italy in 2011 of art trafficking. He appealed but the ruling was upheld.

== Looted objects ==
In 2015 during an investigation into Gianfranco Becchina and his wife Ursula Jurascheka, a joint raid by the Swiss and Italian police discovered looted antiquities values in the tens of millions of dollars. In December 2019 the United States has filed a civil complaint seeking the forfeiture of an Attic Etruscan votive statuette that was recovered by the FBI and HSI years after it was illegally excavated and smuggled out of Italy. In 2023, Matteo Messina Denaro, an organized crime boss in Italy claimed that he had links to Becchina whose assets were seized in connection to the investigation.

Efforts to recover looted antiquities that passed through Becchina are ongoing.

== See also ==
- Douglas Latchford – British art dealer (1931–2020)
- Robert E. Hecht – American antiquities art dealer (1919–2012)
- Carabinieri – Italian gendarmerie
