= Brunilde Ridgway =

Italian art historian (1929–2024)

Brunilde Sismondo Ridgway (14 November 1929 – 19 October 2024) was an Italian-American archaeologist and specialist in ancient Greek sculpture.

== Life and career ==
The daughter of Giuseppe Sismondo, a career army officer, and Maria (Lombardo) Sismondo, Ridgway was born in Chieti on 14 November 1929; as a young child she lived in Sicily and then in Ethiopia and Eritrea, where her father had been stationed during World War II. When her father was captured by the British in World War II and sent to a prisoner-of-war camp in Kenya, she secured a job as a telephone operator at police headquarters in Asmara (Eritrea) where she learned to speak English.

After World War II, she studied classics at the University of Messina, where she obtained her degree in classics in 1953. An archaeology scholarship and Fulbright Travel Grant allowed her to continue her studies at Bryn Mawr College in Pennsylvania, where she came under the tutelage of Rhys Carpenter. At the end of her MA, she wrote her thesis on Archaic sculpture at the American School of Classical Studies at Athens. She received her Ph.D. in 1958 and returned as a teacher to Bryn Mawr, where she spent most of her career.

In 1977, she was named Rhys Carpenter Professor of Classical and Near Eastern Archaeology, a post she held until her retirement in 1994. In 1988, she won the Gold Medal of the Archaeological Institute of America. She was elected to the American Philosophical Society in 1993. She married physical therapist Henry W. Ridgway in 1958.

Ridgway died in Haverford, Pennsylvania on 19 October 2024, at the age of 94.

== Views and opinions ==
Brunilde Ridgway is, in keeping with her mentor Rhys Carpenter, a follower of the radical questioning of the Meisterforschung, or search for the masterpiece or archetype that inspired a replica series, that dominated the history of Greek art since Adolf Furtwängler. Elaborating on Carpenter's remark that Greek sculpture is “the anonymous product of an impersonal craft,” she maintained that the notion of the artistic personality didn't emerge in the West before the 15th century AD. She also addressed the Kopienforschung ("copy research") of Johann Joachim Winckelmann, who is finding a type statuary through its Roman copies, focusing on identifying the originality of Roman sculptors. Rather skeptical vis-à-vis the literary sources, she stuck to the stylistic analysis of the works.

Known for the safety of her erudition and for the stimulating quality of its analyses, it has been criticized, like Carpenter, for what was described as a "devastating" or "systematic scepticism”, or revisionism.

== Selected writings ==
Her main works and writings are:

- Severe Style in Greek Sculpture, Princeton University Press, 1970.
- "The Aphrodite of Arles", in American Journal of Archæology, vol. 80, No. 2 (Spring 1976), pp. 147–154.
- The Archaic Style in Greek Sculpture, Princeton University Press, 1977 (revised and expanded edition in 1993).
- Fifth Century Styles in Greek Sculpture, Princeton University Press, 1981.
- Roman copies of Greek Sculpture: The Problem of the Originals, The Jerome Lectures University of Michigan Press, 1984
- "The State of Research in Ancient Art" in Art Bulletin, LXVIII (1986), pp. 8–23.
- Hellenistic Sculpture I: The Styles of ca. 331-200 BC, University of Wisconsin Press, 1990
- Fourth-Century Styles in Greek Sculpture, University of Wisconsin Press, 1997.
- "Prayers in Stone: Greek Architectural Sculpture (c. 600-100 B.C.E) " (the Sather Lectures 1996, vol. 63) (U. of CA Press, 1999)
- Hellenistic Sculpture II: The Styles of ca. 200-100 BC, University of Wisconsin Press, 2000. ISBN 9780299118204
- Hellenistic Sculpture III: The Styles of ca 100-31 BC, University of Wisconsin Press, 2002. ISBN 978-0299177102
- Second Chance: Greek Revisited Sculptural Studies, University of Wisconsin Press, Pindar Press, 2004. ISBN 978-1899828890
