= New York Kouros =

Early Greek life-sized statuary

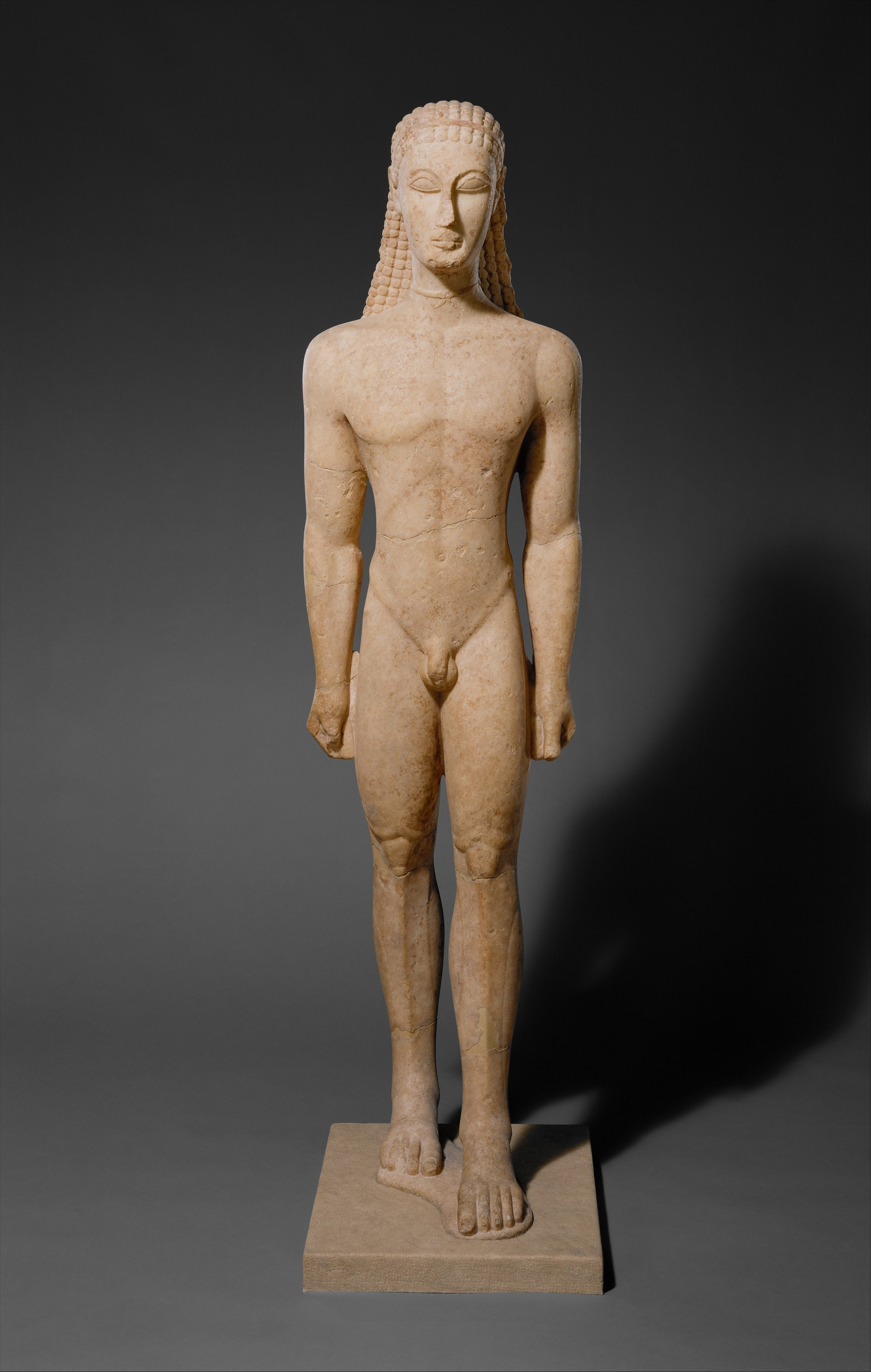
- Medium: Naxian Marble Statue
- Subject: Athenian aristocrat
- Dimensions: 194.6 cm × 51.6 cm × 63.2 cm (76.6 in × 20.3 in × 24.9 in)
- Location: The Metropolitan Museum of Art
- Accession: 32.11.1

The New York Kouros is an early example of life-sized statuary in Greece. The marble statue of a Greek youth, kouros, was carved in Attica, has an Egyptian pose, and is otherwise separated from the block of stone. It is named for its current location, at the Metropolitan Museum of Art in New York City. The Metropolitan Museum of Art said in "Marble statue of a kouros (youth)" that "The statue marked the grave of a young Athenian aristocrat."

== Style ==
The statue is similar to the (near-contemporary) statue of Mentuemhet (Note: Statue of Montuemhat, Egyptian Museum, JE 336933 (CG 42236)) and represents an example of daedalic statuary style. The statue is stylized and not representational. It is highly geometric, and the body is idealized and abstracted, especially in the muscles and the areas of the joints. The eyes and face are not realistic to how a person would look; this statue is not attempting to be observational in nature. The motif of a male figure with his arms straight to his sides, standing upright, and facing forward is unmistakable. The kouros is stiff, rigid, and linear; there is little movement depicted and the figure's specifics aren't touched on in the overall body outline of the subject. However, the left foot is displayed as forward of the right foot, potentially signaling to the viewer that the kouros is walking.

== Context ==
This kouros was carved in Attica during the archaic period of Ancient Greece. It was a time that Greece was splintered into many city-states. Greek artists were making more and more naturalistic representations of the human figure throughout the 6th century BC. During this time, Greece was coming out of an orientalizing period, where Ancient Greece was increasingly influenced by various eastern and southern civilizations. This explains why the statue takes on a more natural look than previous Greek art yet still retains those orientalizing features—particularly the Egyptian influence, with whom they had considerable contact. Kouroi were often used as grave markers or dedications for the gods.

Many kouroi, in the style of this one, were typically heavily Egyptian influenced, with the left leg forward and arms to the side. Historical evidence suggests that Greeks had some familiarity with Egyptian technical procedures by this point and that Greek visitors to Egypt—charmed by the colossal Egyptian statuary they saw—persuaded Greek sculptors to adopt and augment the style to remove, in the words of Hurwit, Plantzos, and Campbell in Kouros, “the stone screens connecting legs and arms”, “the vertical slab against which Egyptian statues were usually set”, and to strip the subject matter down to the nude. They also used the Egyptian grid system.

=== Pose ===
External videos
- New York Kouros, Smarthistory

The Department of Greek and Roman Art at the Metropolitan Museum of Art stated in Greek Art in the Archaic Period that through the proportions of the statue, as well as its pose, this particular kouros shows its influence from Egypt. In fact, like many other kouroi, the pose and stance itself was directly borrowed from Egyptian art, likely explaining its similarity to statues such as the statue of Mentuemhet and the iconography behind the similar stance and posture. This kouros served as the grave marker for a young Athenian Aristocrat and was produced by a person of the Attic culture. This is shown because in Athenian culture funerary monuments were especially popular for marking the graves of people who died young (but not necessarily depicting them). In these respects, this kouros is very typical for the Greek kouroi of the time.

The dimensions are: 76 5/8 × 20 5/16 × 24 7/8 in. (194.6 × 51.6 × 63.2 cm) Other (height w/o plinth): 76 5/8 in. (194.6 cm) Other (Height of Head): 12 in. (30.5 cm) Other (Length of face): 8 7/8 in. (22.6 cm) Other (shoulder width): 20 5/16 in. (51.6 cm) c. 590–580 BCE.
