= Maiuma =

Maiuma, Maiumas, Maiouma, Maïouma or Maioumas is the name of an ancient festival and related toponyms. Maiuma may refer to:

- Maiuma (city), ancient port city of Gaza
- Maiuma (festival), ancient water festival dedicated to Dionysus and Aphrodite

== Other locations ==
- Betomarsea-Maiumas, near Charachmoba (today's al-Karak), known from the Madaba Map
- Maiumas (civitas Maiuma Ascalonitis), the 6th-c. harbour of Ascalon, known from Piacenza Pilgrim's itinerarium, perhaps today's Khirbat al-Ashraf
- Maiumas or Kefar Shuni, also Shumi/Shami, later Khirbat Miyāmās, Khirbat al-Shuna, today in Binyamina

== See also ==
- May Day, modern festival; Maiuma was one of its predecessors
