= Theodosius of Jerusalem (died 457) =

Theodosius (died 457) was one of the leading Christian monks of Palestine opposed to the Council of Chalcedon (451). He was installed as bishop of Jerusalem in opposition Juvenal in 451 or 452, but was forced into exile by the emperor Marcian in 453.

Information about his life comes mainly from the works of John Rufus. These include a biography of Peter the Iberian and a narration of Theodosius' exile and death, the Narratio de obitu Theodosii Hierosolymitani. The latter is a short text known only from the Syriac version in two manuscripts. Rufus describes Theodosius as a confessor and martyr. A complementary anti-Chalcedonian Syriac account is found in Pseudo-Zacharias Rhetor. A Chalcedonian version of events is given in Cyril of Scythopolis' biography of Euthymius the Great.

When Juvenal returned to Jerusalem from Chalcedon in 451, many monks and clergy tried to persuade him to recant his acceptance of the council's canons. When he refused, they elected Theodosius as bishop in opposition and Juvenal fled. In the violence that ensued, many supporters of the Council of Chalcedon died, including Bishop Severianus of Scythopolis. Theodosius consecrated many anti-Chalcedonian bishops, including Peter the Iberian in the diocese of Maiuma. When Juvenal returned with imperial troops in August 453, there were briefly two active bishops in the city. Theodosius, however, accepted a sentence of exile and did not fight. The bishops he consecrated, except for Peter, were deposed.

Theodosius first went to Egypt or perhaps Sinai. He then went to Antioch, perhaps to secure the support of Symeon Stylites, but was arrested at the city gates. On the orders of Marcian, he was brought to Constantinople. When he refused Marcian's entreaties to accept Chalcedon, he was imprisoned in the monastery of Saint Dios. When the abbot of that house was unable to win him over, he moved him to a narrow unheated cell for the winter. Theodosius fell seriously ill. When Leo I succeeded Marcian, he turned Theodosius over to the custody of the anti-Chalcedonian monks of Sykai. The deposed bishop died only a few days later. His body was taken to Cyprus to prevent the Chalcedonians from stealing it to claim he had changed his mind. It was buried in an anti-Chalcedonian monastery. The Narratio records that Theodosius' companion, Abban Romanus, was recalled to Palestine after his death.

In the Coptic Orthodox Church, Theodosius was remembered as a champion of orthodoxy against Chalcedonism. Two works are attributed to him, but both are late Coptic forgeries. The first, In Honor of Victor, is a biography of the martyr Victor Stratelates. It is a poorly written text describing the virtues of Victor and the miracles he performed at Jerusalem. It is preserved in a codex from the White Monastery. The second, The Miracles of Saint George, is a homily on the miracles of Saint George, mostly surrounding the construction of his shrine in Jaffa.

== Sources ==
- Bitton-Ashkelony, Brouria; Kofsky, Aryeh (2006). The Monastic School of Gaza. Brill. ISBN 90-04-14737-3. ISSN 0920-623X.
- Butler, Alban (1821). The Lives of the Fathers, Martyrs, and Other Principal Saints. London.
- Honigmann, Ernest (1950). "Juvenal of Jerusalem". Dumbarton Oaks Papers. 5: 209–279. doi:10.2307/1291078. JSTOR 1291078.
- Horn, Cornelia B. (2006). Asceticism and Christological Controversy in Fifth-Century Palestine: The Career of Peter the Iberian. Oxford University Press.
- Horn, Cornelia B.; Phenix, Robert R. Jr., eds. (2008). John Rufus: The Lives of Peter the Iberian, Theodosius of Jerusalem, and the Monk Romanus. Society of Biblical Literature. ISBN 978-1-58983-200-8.
- Orlandi, Tito (1991). "Theodosius of Jerusalem". In Aziz Suryal Atiya (ed.). The Coptic Encyclopedia. Vol. 7. New York: Macmillan Publishers. cols. 2242a–2242b.
- Parvis, Paul (2018a). "Narratio de Obitu Theodosii Hierosolymitani". In Oliver Nicholson (ed.). The Oxford Dictionary of Late Antiquity. Vol. 2. Oxford University Press. p. 1058.
- Parvis, Paul (2018b). "Theodosius of Jerusalem". In Oliver Nicholson (ed.). The Oxford Dictionary of Late Antiquity. Vol. 2. Oxford University Press. p. 1486.
