= Silvanus of Gaza =

5th-century Christian monk in Egypt and Gaza

Abba Silvanus
- Born: Palestine
- Residence: Scetes
- Died: before 414 AD; Gaza
- Canonized: Pre-Congregation
- Influenced: Zeno the Prophet
- Tradition or genre: Fathers of the desert

Abba Silvanus (died before 414) was a Christian monk who lived during the 4th and 5th centuries. He was one of the Desert Fathers.

== Biography ==
=== Scetis and Sinai ===
Silvanus was born in Palestine. He led a community of 12 disciples in Scetis, Egypt, among them Zacharias, Mark the Calligrapher, Netras (later bishop of Paran) and Zeno. According to his hagiography, he was blessed with the gift of prophecy, guessing the questions of his disciples and knowing their sins before they confessed them.

Following the incursion of barbarian tribes into Egypt in 380, the group moved from Scetis to Sinai where they stayed for around a decade or at least enough for Silvanus to become famous and have people visit him from Egypt. The group seems to have enjoyed to host visitors and tended to a garden.

=== Life in Gaza ===
Later (around 390) Silvanus and his disciples moved to Gaza where they settled along the Gerar river. Here, they followed the model of the eremitic monasteries of Scetis and build several hermit cells along the watercourse with a church and domestic building that served the needs of the community, similar to the lauras of the Judean Desert. During the week they occupied themselves with prayer and various forms of manual labour while on Saturdays and Sundays they gathered for communal prayers and meals and Silvanus would visit the other monks.

Silvanus died sometime before 414 A.D. and was succeeded by Zacharias, one of his disciples. Zeno, one of Silvanus' disciples and later teacher of Peter the Iberian, founded another monastery two kilometres south-east of Silvanus' monastery in ca. 440.
