= Zeno the Prophet =

5th century Palestinian abbot

Saint Zeno the Prophet

Desert Father Venerable Wonderworker
- Born: Egypt
- Residence: Gaza
- Died: ca. 451 AD; Gaza
- Venerated in: Eastern Orthodox Church
- Feast: 19 June
- Influences: Silvanus of Gaza
- Influenced: Peter the Iberian

Zeno the Prophet (died ca. 451 AD), also known as Zeno the Wonderworker, was an Egyptian monk and a Desert Father. He was disciple of the hermit Silvanus of Gaza, became the spiritual guide of the famous Georgian Peter the Iberian and is venerated as a saint by the Eastern Orthodox Church on 19 June.

== Biography ==
Zeno first appears as a disciple in the community of Silvanus of Gaza who moved from Egypt via the Sinai to Gaza. Not much is known from his early period of life in Scetis and most relations relate to his later life in Palestine though he remained in connection with Egypt as monks from there sought him out for advice.

Many saw him as a spiritual teacher and among his disciples were Peter the Iberian and his companion John the Prophet whom he met in Jerusalem. Zeno, who roamed frequently to various monastic centres, stayed many times in Jerusalem where he worked miracles and gave spiritual direction.

Around 440, he settled in Kefar Shearta, today identified with Horvat Se'orah (Arabic: Khirbet Se'arta), north of Nahal Besor. Towards the end of his life, he lived for a year in utter seclusion as a hermit before dying as seems to have been customary for Palestinian monasticism (see Abba Isaiah and Barsanuphius). Zeno's death seems to have occurred around the year 451.

== Legacy ==
Most of Zeno's life is known from what John Rufus' eighth chapter of Plerophoriae which he dedicated to him as well as from Rufus' Life of Peter the Iberian. Further information about him is found in the Apophthegmata where he is mentioned as an outstanding example of the eremitic ideal and someone who never settled down; as well as in the apologetic work Theophrastus by Aeneas of Gaza.

Zeno is venerated as a saint in the Eastern Orthodox Church on June 19.

== Sources ==
- Bitton-Ashkelony, Brouria; Kofsky, Aryeh (February 2006). The Monastic School of Gaza. Brill. pp. 36–42. ISBN 9789047408444.
- Chryssavgis, John (March 2017). John Climacus From the Egyptian Desert to the Sinaite Mountain. Taylor & Francis. p. 160. ISBN 9781351925211.
- Kofsky, Arieh; Bitton-Ashkelony, Bruria (2004). Christian Gaza in Late Antiquity. Brill. pp. 76–77. ISBN 9789004138681.
