= John the Eunuch =

John the Eunuch can refer to:

- John the Laz, 5th-centuryGeorgian monk and theologian
- John the Orphanotrophos, 11th-century Byzantine courtier
- John the Eunuch (Trebizond), 14th-century courtier in the Empire of Trebizond
- The masculine name of the titular saint in the Syriac version of the Legend of Hilaria
