= Severian of Scythopolis =

Saint Severianus Bishop of Scythopolis
- Died: 21 February 453 (official); Jerusalem
- Feast: 21 February

Saint Severian or Severianus (died in late 452 or early 453; officially on 21 February 453) was bishop of Scythopolis in Palestine. He was martyred and is considered a saint. His feast day is 21 February.

== Life ==
Scythopolis was made the capital of the new province of Palaestina Secunda around 400 by the emperor Theodosius II. The relationship between the bishop of Scythopolis and the metropolitan of Caesarea was not well defined. Severianus was appointed bishop of Scythopolis, metropolitan of the province of Palestine II. His name is among the signatories to the Definition of Faith of the Council of Chalcedon (451), but he probably was not present at the council.

Severianus was killed because he had implemented the Chalcedonian faith among the Christians of Palestine. He was murdered during the unrest caused by the Definition, which stated that the divinity and humanity of Christ were two distinct but inseparable natures, contradicting the archimandrite Eutyches.

== Butler's account ==
The hagiographer Alban Butler wrote in the Lives of the fathers, martyrs, and other principal saints (1821),

February XXI

St. Severianus, Martyr.
Bishop of Scythopolis.

From the life of St. Euthymius, written by Cyril the monk; a letter of the Emperor Marcian; Evagrius, l. 2. c. 5. Nicephorus Calixt. l. 15. c. 9. collected by Bollandus, p. 246.

A.D. 452, or 453.

IN the reign of Marcian and St. Pulcheria, the council of Chalcedon which condemned the Eutychian heresy, was received by St. Euthymius, and by a great part of the monks of Palestine. But Theodosius, an ignorant Eutychian monk, and a man of a most tyrannical temper, under the protection of the empress Eudoxia, widow of Theodosius the Younger, who lived at Jerusalem, perverted many among the monks themselves, and having obliged Juvenal, bishop of Jerusalem, to withdraw, unjustly possessed himself of that important see, and in a cruel persecution which he raised, filled Jerusalem with blood, as the emperor Marcian assures us: then, at the head of a band of soldiers, he carried desolation over the country. Many however had the courage to stand their ground. No one resisted him with greater zeal and resolution than Severianus, bishop of Scythopolis, and his recompense was the crown of martyrdom; for the furious soldiers seized his person, dragged him out of the city, and massacred him in the latter part of the year 452, or in the beginning of the year 453. His name occurs in the Roman Martyrology, on the 21st of February.

== Sources ==
- Butler, Alban (1821), The lives of the fathers, martyrs, and other principal saints
- Caner, Daniel F. (2010), History and Hagiography from the Late Antique Sinai: Including Translations of Pseudo-Nilus' Narrations, Ammonius' Report on the Slaughter of the Monks of Sinai and Rhaithou, and Anastasius of Sinai's Tales of the Sinai Fathers, Liverpool University Press, ISBN 978-1-84631-216-8
- Heyden, Katharina (2010-09-27), "Beth Shean/Scythopolis in Late Antiquity", in Reinhard G. Kratz, Hermann Spieckermann (ed.), One God – One Cult – One Nation: Archaeological and Biblical Perspectives, Walter de Gruyter, ISBN 978-3-11-022358-3
