= Khirbat al-Shuna =

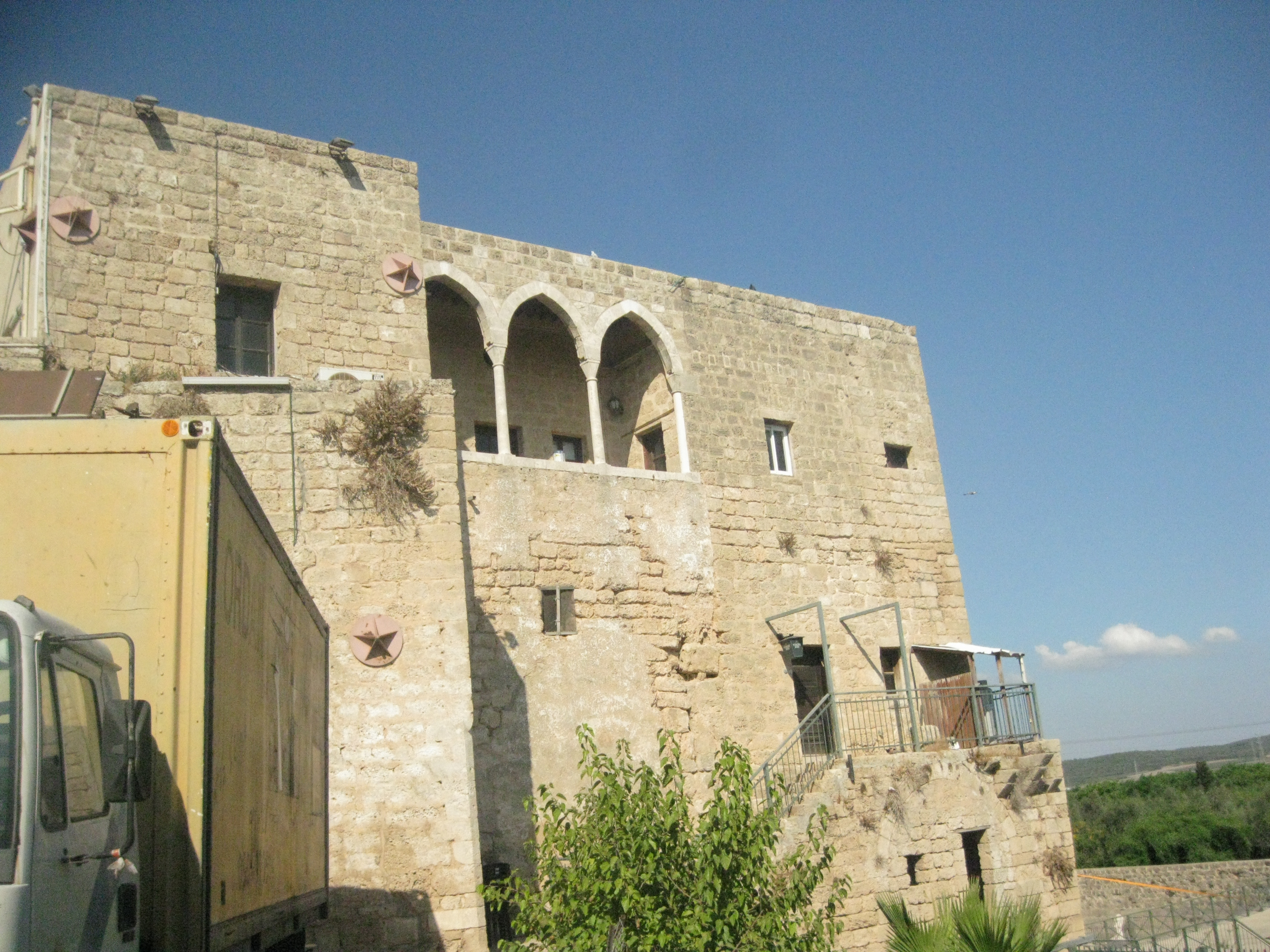
- Khirbat al-Shuna house, presently in Jabotinsky Park in Binyamina

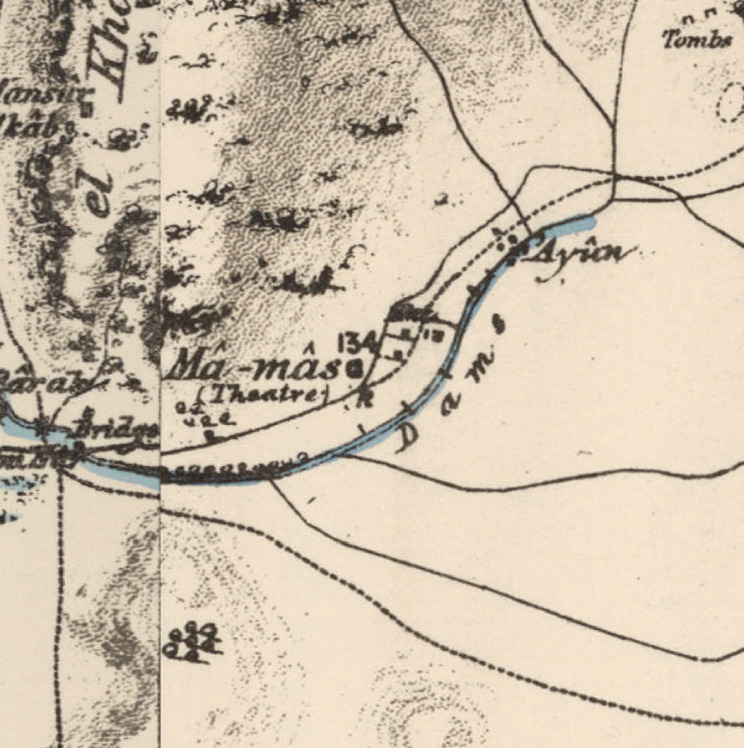
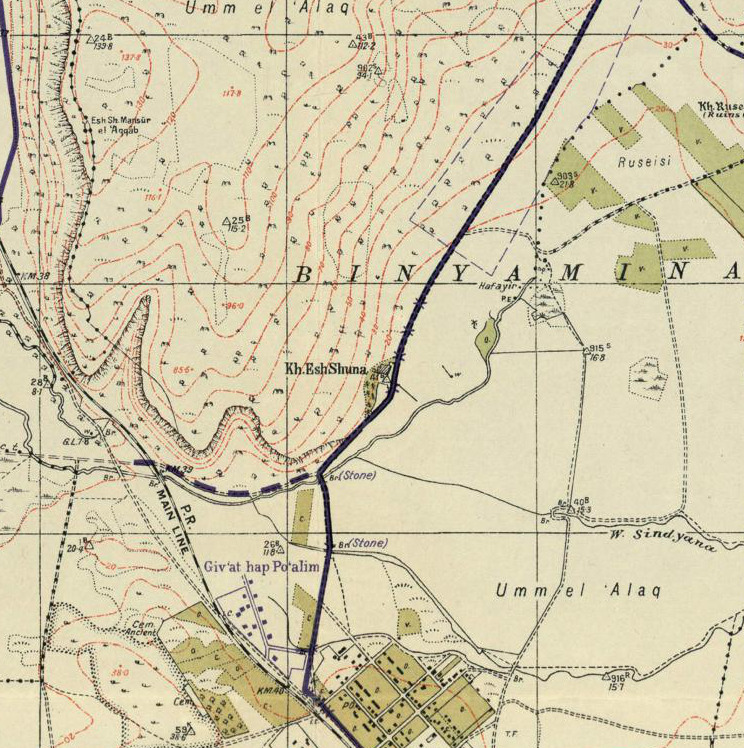
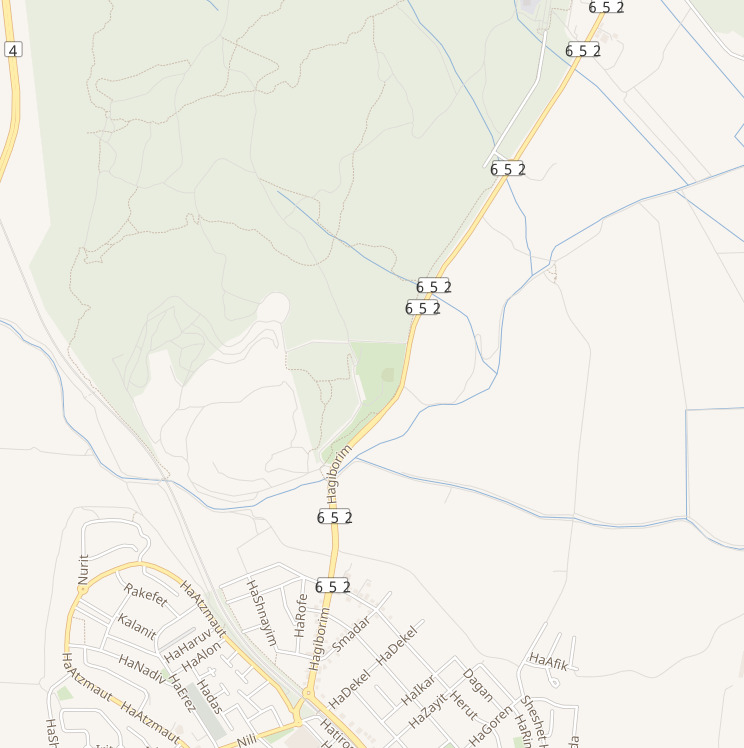
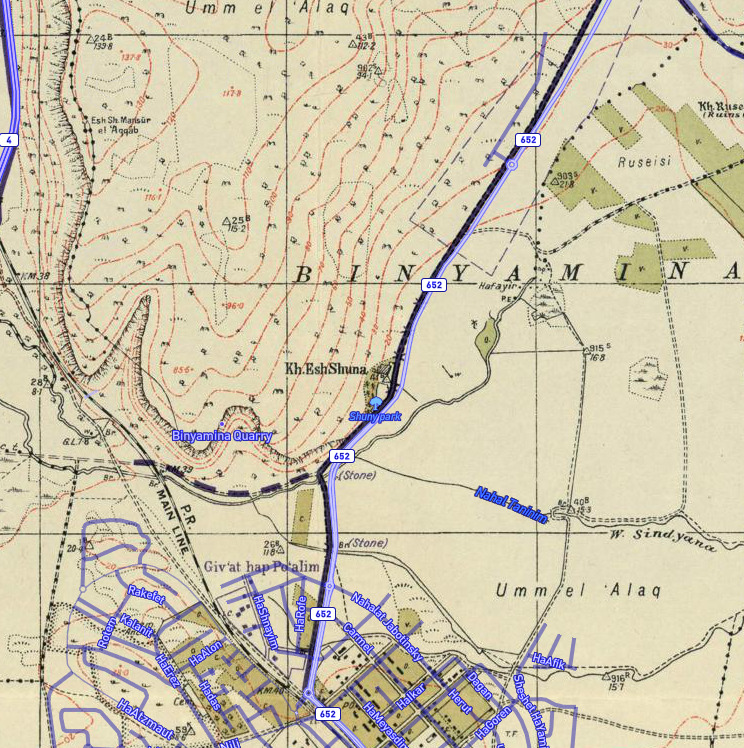
- 1870s map 1940s map modern map 1940s with modern overlay map A series of historical maps of the area around Khirbat al-Shuna (click the buttons)

- Location within Mandatory Palestine
- Coordinates: 32°32′05″N 34°56′51″E
- Palestine grid: 145/215
- Geopolitical entity: Mandatory Palestine
- Subdistrict: Haifa
- Date of depopulation: March 15, 1948

Khirbat al-Shuna or Khirbat ash-Shuna was a Palestinian Arab hamlet in the Haifa Subdistrict. It was located 32.5 km south of Haifa. Khirbat al-Shuna contained a small archaeological site, Khirbat Tell Mubarak. The area is now known as Shuni and is part of a JNF park, immediately north of Binyamina-Giv'at Ada.

== History ==
=== British Mandate ===
In the 1922 census of Palestine, conducted by the British Mandate authorities, it was called Shuneh, and had a population of 15 Muslim and 51 Jewish inhabitants, while in the 1931 census it was counted as Esh Shuna under Zikhron Ya'akov, which had a total 214 Muslim inhabitants.

In 1948, it was classified as a hamlet. It was depopulated during the 1947–1948 Civil War in Mandatory Palestine on March 15, 1948.

=== Israel ===
In 1992, the site was described: "The site is fenced in and the few standing houses have been renovated and turned into tourist facilities. There are tall palm and eucalyptus trees and cactuses grow around the houses".

== See also ==
- Maiuma (festival), held in antiquity in Shuni-Maiumas

== Bibliography ==
- Barron, J.B., ed. (1923). Palestine: Report and General Abstracts of the Census of 1922. Government of Palestine.
- Khalidi, W. (1992). All That Remains: The Palestinian Villages Occupied and Depopulated by Israel in 1948. Washington D.C.: Institute for Palestine Studies. ISBN 0-88728-224-5.
- Mills, E., ed. (1932). Census of Palestine 1931. Population of Villages, Towns and Administrative Areas. Jerusalem: Government of Palestine.
- Morris, B. (2004). The Birth of the Palestinian Refugee Problem Revisited. Cambridge University Press. ISBN 978-0-521-00967-6.
