= Valerius (consul 432) =

East Roman politician

Valerius (Greek: Ουαλέριος fl. 421–455) was a politician of the Eastern Roman Empire, brother of the Empress Aelia Eudocia.

== Life ==
Valerius was born in Athens, son of the pagan and sophist philosopher Leontius, and brother of Gessius and Athenais. In 421 Athenais changed her name to Aelia Eudocia and married the Emperor Theodosius II; as result, Valerius and Gessius received several honours.

First Valerius was appointed comes rerum privatarum (425), then comes sacrarum largitionum, then consul in 432, to be finally appointed magister officiorum in 435.

In 455 Valerius wrote to his sister, at Jerusalem, trying to persuade her to leave the christological party of Eutyches and to return to the Nicene faith, to which Valerius evidently belonged.

== Sources ==
- Martindale, John R., ed. (1980). "Valerius 6". The Prosopography of the Later Roman Empire: Volume II, AD 395–527. Cambridge: Cambridge University Press. p. 1145. ISBN 0-521-20159-4.

Political offices
Preceded by Anicius Auchenius Bassus; Antiochus	Roman consul 432 with Flavius Aetius	Succeeded by Theodosius Augustus XIV; Petronius Maximus
