= Gessia gens =

The gens Gessia was a minor Roman family, known chiefly from the east of Imperial times. Members of this gens are first mentioned toward the end of the second century BC. Although they were of senatorial rank, none of the Gessii are known to have held any curule magistracies. The emperor Severus Alexander is believed to have been descended from a branch of this family.

== Members ==
This list includes abbreviated praenomina. For an explanation of this practice, see filiation.

- Publius Gessius P. f., a member of the Roman senate in 129 BC.
- Decimus Gessius, father of the Delian Gessius.
- Decimus Gessius D. f., mentioned in an inscription from Delos, dated to about 125 BC.
- Lucius Gessius Optatus, built an altar for Neptune at Roatto.
- Publius Gessius P. f. Vala, the name is mentioned in an inscription found in Praeneste, which is dated between 130 and 81 BC.
- Publius Gessius P. f., mentioned on a monument found near Viterbo, probably dating to about AD 50.
- Publius Gessius P. l. Primus, freedman of Publius Gessius.
- Gessia P. l. Fausta, freedwoman of Publius Gessius.
- Aulus Gessius was the chief magistrate of Smyrna during the reigns of Claudius and Nero. His name is preserved on coins commemorating the marriage of Claudius and Agrippina the Younger.
- Gessius Florus, procurator of Judea during the reign of Nero. Josephus considers his numerous abuses of power and efforts to distract attention from them with instigating the First Jewish–Roman War.
- Gessius Marcianus, procurator, possibly in Syria, in the latter part of the second century, and perhaps the early part of the third; he was possibly the father, or more likely step-father of emperor Severus Alexander. He was put to death on the orders of Macrinus in 218.
- Marcus Julius Gessius Bassianus, a priest of the Arval Brethren during the reign of Caracalla; possibly a brother of Severus Alexander.
- Theoclia, the sister of Severus Alexander

== See also ==
- List of Roman gentes
- Gessius of Petra
- Gessius (praetorian prefect)

== Bibliography ==
- Lucius Cassius Dio Cocceianus (Cassius Dio), Roman History.
- Corpus Inscriptionum Latinarum.
- Dictionary of Greek and Roman Biography and Mythology, William Smith, ed., Little, Brown and Company, Boston (1849).
- Robert K. Sherk, "The Text of the Senatus Consultum De Agro Pergameno", in Greek, Roman, and Byzantine Studies, vol. 7, pp. 361–369 (1966).
