= Aelia Eudocia =

Eastern Roman empress by marriage to Theodosius II

- Augusta
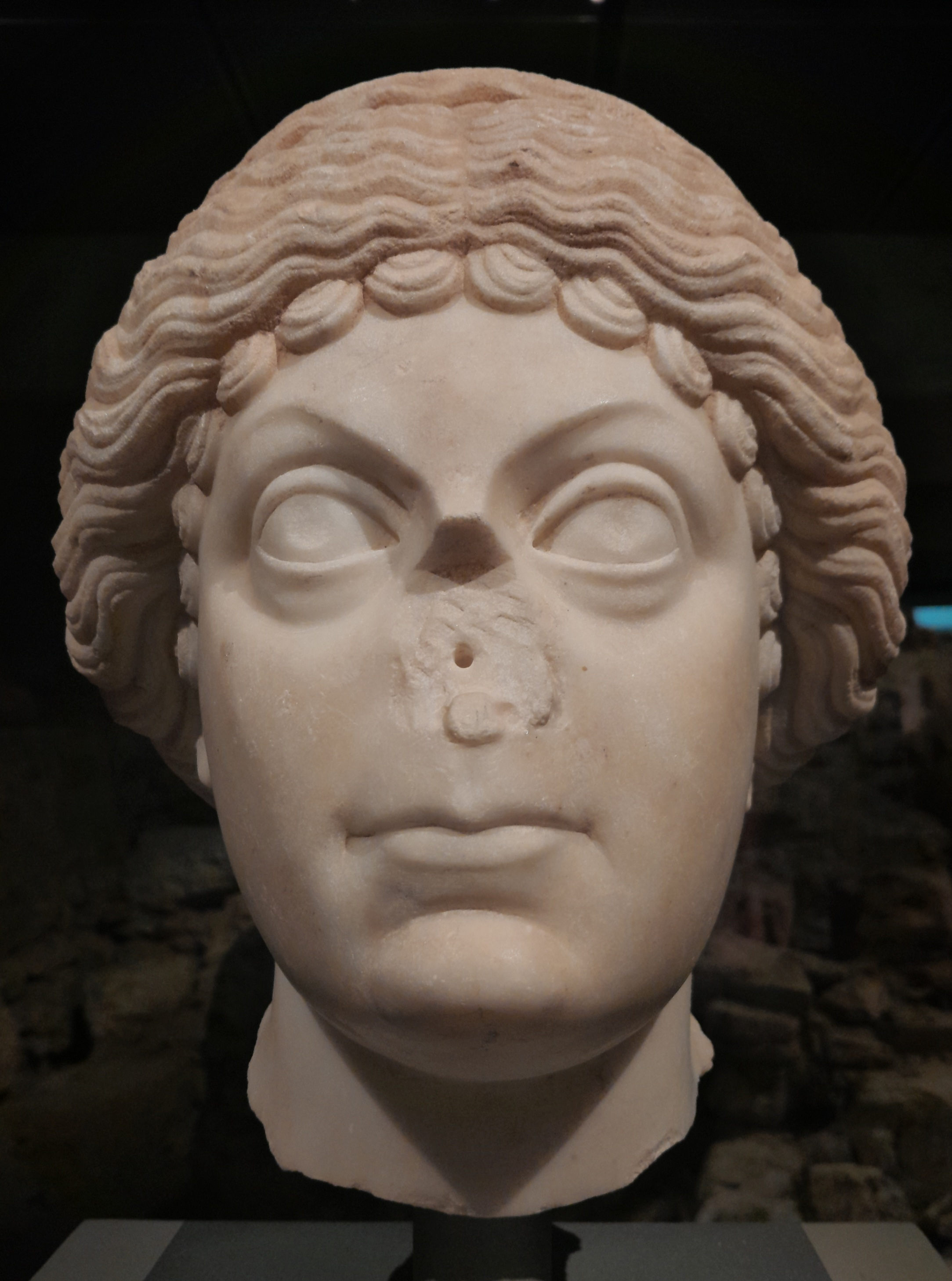
- Portrait of an empress in the Acropolis Museum in Athens, likely Aelia Eudocia

Roman empress
- Tenure: 7 June 421 – 28 July 450
- Born: Athenais c. 400; Athens
- Died: 20 October 460 (aged approx. 60); Jerusalem
- Spouse: Theodosius II
- Issue Detail: Licinia Eudoxia; Flaccilla; Arcadius (possibly)
Regnal name
- Aelia Eudocia Augusta
- Father: Leontius

Aelia Eudocia Augusta (/ˈiːliə juːˈdoʊʃə ɔːˈɡʌstə/; Ancient Greek: Αἰλία Εὐδοκία Αὐγούστα; c. 400 – 460 AD), also called Saint Eudocia, was an Eastern Roman empress by marriage to Emperor Theodosius II (r. 408–450). The daughter of an Athenian philosopher, she was also a poet, whose works include Homerocentones, or Homeric retellings of Biblical stories. After an estrangement with Theodosius, she permanently settled in Jerusalem, where she supported the local population.

== Early life ==
Aelia Eudocia was born with the name Athenaïs in Athens. The 6th century chronicler John Malalas describes her as Greek. Her exact year of birth is not known, but it is often given as c. 400 or c. 401 on the assumption that she was born around the same time of Emperor Theodosius II (401 AD). She was said to be of pagan background, and according to her contemporary Socrates Scholasticus, she was baptized shortly before her marriage to Theodosius. Her father, an Athenian sophist named Leontius, taught rhetoric at the Academy of Athens, where people from all over the Mediterranean came to either teach or learn. Eudocia's birth name, Athenaïs, was a pagan name probably chosen for her parents' devotion to Attic culture, or perhaps in honour of the city's protector, the goddess Pallas Athena. She had two brothers, Gessius and Valerius, who would later receive honours at court from their sister and brother-in-law. Eudocia's father took charge of her education after her mother's death, and she was later taught by the scholars Hyperechios, one of the Desert Fathers of Christianity, and Orion.

John Malalas preserves a tale that when her father died, he left all his property to her brothers, with only 100 coins reserved for her in his will, saying that "[s]ufficient for her is her destiny, which will be the greatest of any woman." Athenaïs had been her father's confidante and had expected more than this meager 100-coin inheritance. She begged her brothers, to give her an equal share of their father's property, but they refused. Shortly after her father's death, Athenaïs went to live with her aunt, who advised her to go to Constantinople and "ask for justice from the Emperor", confident she would receive her fair share of her father's wealth.

Historian Kenneth Holum further introduced the suggestion that her father, Leontius, was a native of Antioch rather than Athens. He bases this claim on fragments by Olympiodorus of Thebes, who wrote of the time he tried to secure a public teaching job for a man named Leontius, who was reluctant. Holum assumes this Leontius was Eudocia's father and theorises that he was "unwilling" to take the job due to a humiliating initiation ritual which befell newcomers, "especially foreigners". The fragment states, however, that this initiation was required for every man aiming for the rank of sophist, foreigner or otherwise. Holum suggests that Eudocia may have been named after the great city of Athens, but she would have been born in Antioch. The argument has been doubted by some scholars, because the building activity of Eudocia in the 420s focused on Athens rather than Antioch. Cameron writes that there is "no call to doubt that Eudocia was born in Athens."

== Life as an empress ==
=== Marriage ===
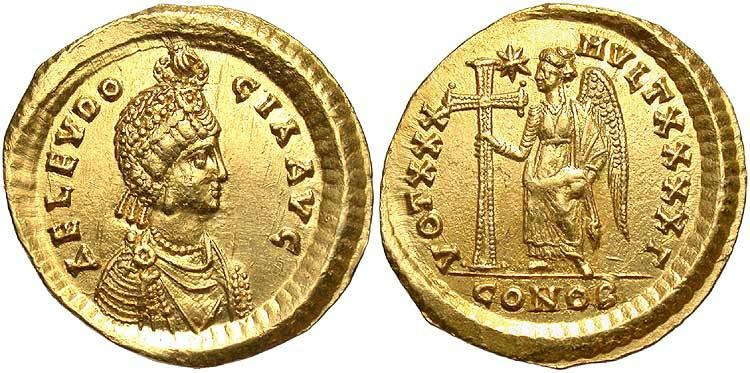
A coin depicting Aelia Eudocia, 425–429 AD

Legend has it that when Theodosius was 20 years old, he wanted to get married. He talked to his sister Pulcheria, who began to search for a maiden fit for her brother, that was of either "patrician or imperial blood". His longtime childhood friend, Paulinus, also helped Theodosius in his search. The Emperor's search began at the same time that Athenaïs had arrived in Constantinople. Pulcheria had heard about this young woman, who had only 100 coins to her name, and when she met her, she was "astonished at her beauty and at the intelligence and sophistication with which she presented her grievance." Athenaïs's aunts assured Pulcheria that she was a virgin and was well educated. Pulcheria reported back to her brother that she had "found a young girl, a Greek maid, very beautiful, pure and dainty, eloquent as well, the daughter of a philosopher", and young Theodosius, who was full of desire, fell in love instantly.

Athenaïs had been raised pagan, and before her marriage to Theodosius II converted to Christianity and was renamed "Eudocia". They were married on 7 June 421, and there were "reports that Theodosius celebrated his wedding with chariot races in the hippodrome". Her brothers, who had rejected her after their father's death, fled since they were fearful of the punishment they thought they were going to receive when they learned that she became empress. Eudocia instead called them to Constantinople, and Theodosius rewarded them. The emperor made Gessius praetorian prefect of Illyricum and gave the title of magister officiorum to Valerius. Both Gessius and Valerius were rewarded because Eudocia believed that their mistreatment of her was part of her destiny. Theodosius also honoured his best friend, Paulinus, with the title of magister officiorum, for he had helped find his wife.

This rags-to-riches story, though it claims to be authentic and is accepted among historians, leads one to believe that the tale may have been twisted due to the detail of how the romance was portrayed. The earliest version of this story appeared more than a century after Eudocia's death in the "World Chronicle" of John Malalas, "an author who did not always distinguish between authentic history and a popular memory of events infused with folk-tale motifs". The facts are that she was the daughter of Leontius and she did originally have the name Athenaïs, according to the contemporary historians Socrates of Constantinople, and Priscus of Panion; however, they leave out any mention of Pulcheria's role in playing match-maker for her brother. The historians Sozomen and Theodoret did not include Eudocia in their respective historical works, perhaps because they wrote after 443 when Eudocia had fallen into disgrace.

Eudocia also built the original Church of St. Polyeuctus in Constantinople, which her great-granddaughter Anicia Juliana greatly expanded and furnished in the 6th century.

=== Children ===
Eudocia had two, or possibly three, children with Theodosius II. Licinia Eudoxia, born in 422, was the oldest. Licinia Eudoxia had been betrothed since her birth to her cousin, the Western Roman emperor Valentinian III, whom she married on 29 October 437. The second child, Flaccilla, died in 431. Arcadius, if he existed, may have been the only son and died in infancy. Only a year after she gave birth to her first child, Eudocia was proclaimed augusta by her husband on 2 January 423.

Eudocia also was the guardian for the Georgian prince Nabarnugios who had been sent as a hostage to the Byzantine court. Nabarnugious, who would become known as Peter the Iberian, would later decide to become an ascetic and flee to Jerusalem with his friend John the Eunuch.

=== Pilgrimage to Jerusalem (438–439) ===
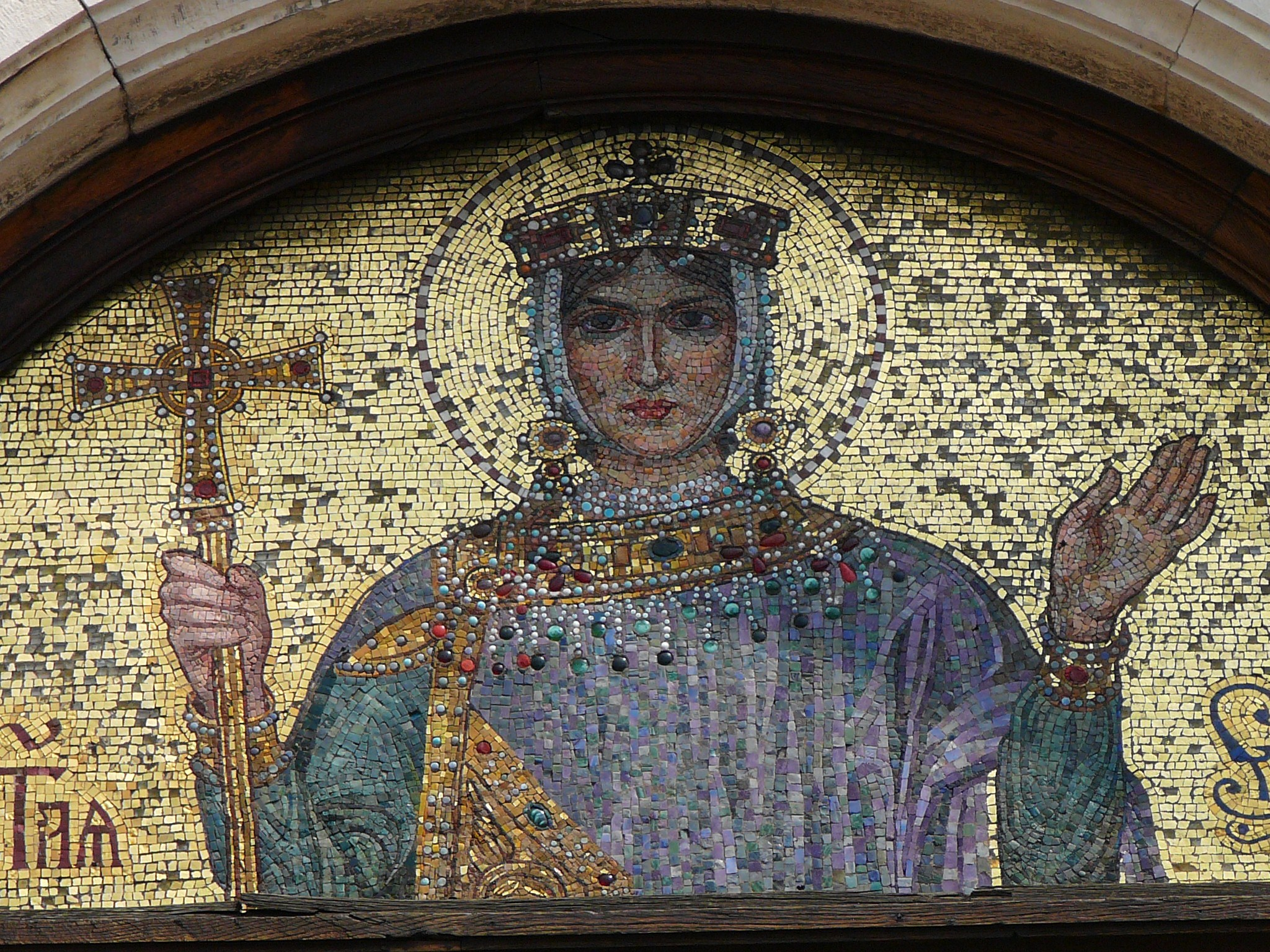
A modern mosaic depicting Eudocia in the Alexander Nevsky Cathedral, Sofia, Bulgaria (consecrated 1924)

After being named Augusta, her relationship to her sister-in-law, Pulcheria, worsened. Eudocia was jealous over the amount of power Pulcheria had within the court, while Pulcheria was jealous of the power Eudocia could claim from her. Their relationship created a "pious atmosphere" in the imperial court, and probably explains why Eudocia travelled to the Holy Land in 438. Eudocia went on a pilgrimage to Jerusalem in 438, bringing back with her holy relics to prove her faith. Her relationship with her husband had deteriorated, and with much pleading from Melania the Younger, a wealthy widow from Palestine and good friend of Eudocia, Theodosius allowed her to go.

=== Visit to Antioch (438) ===
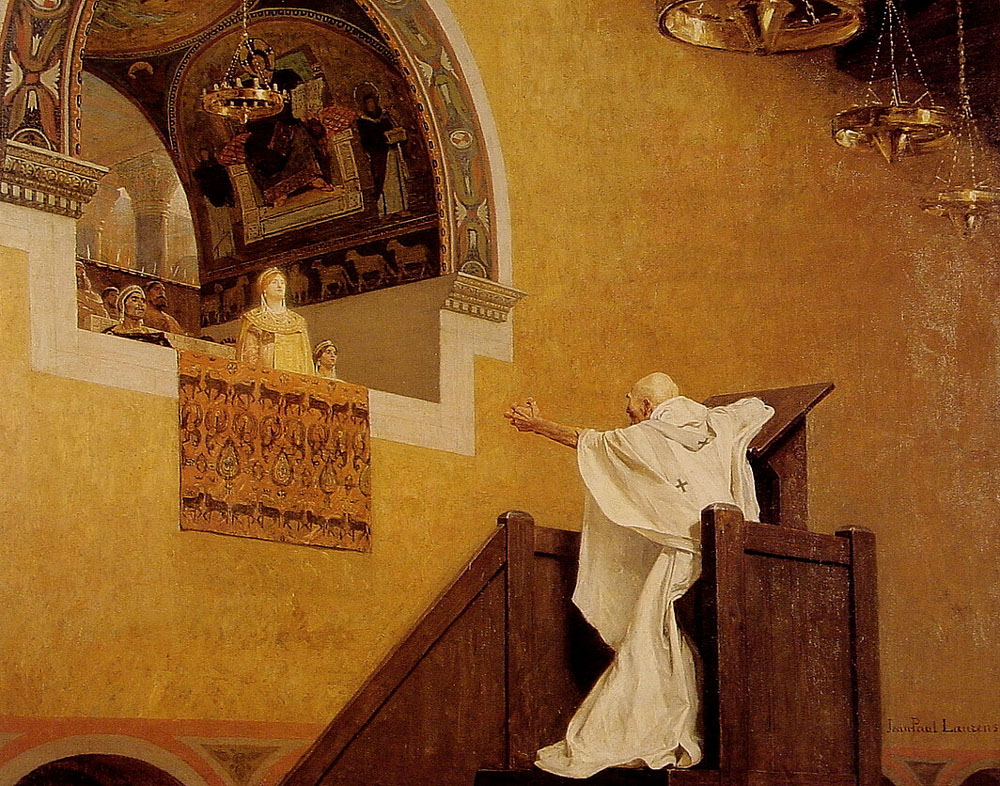
John Chrysostom and Aelia Eudoxia by Jean-Paul Laurens (1880)

While on her pilgrimage to Jerusalem in spring of 438, Eudocia stopped in Antioch, and during her stay she addressed the senate of that city in Hellenic style (i.e., an encomium cast in Homeric hexameters) and distributed funds for the repair of its buildings. She was very conscious of her Greek heritage, as demonstrated in her famous address to the citizens of Antioch where she quoted a famous line by Homer: "ὑμετέρης γενεής τε καὶ αἵματος εὔχομαι εἶναι" ("Of your proud line and blood I claim to be"). Evagrius Scholasticus, who reports this, explains this as a celebratory reference to the Athenians who were among the first colonists of Antioch. These last words of Eudocia's oration brought loud acclaim from the listeners, which resulted in the citizens of Antioch celebrating the Empress Eudocia's Christian Hellenism and commemorating her by erecting a golden statue of her in the curia and a bronze statue in the museum.

Eudocia convinced her husband to "extend the walls of Antioch to take in a large suburb". Furthermore, she also influenced state policy towards pagans and Jews under her husband's reign, and used the powerful influence she had to protect them from persecution. Eudocia also advocated for "reorganization and expansion" of education in Constantinople. Eudocia had been raised with a traditional and classical sophist education, but her goal was to blend classical pagan education with Christianity. This was her way of using her power as empress to honour teachers and education, something that was very important to her in her life.

=== Banishment ===
On her arrival from Jerusalem, her position was allegedly undermined by the jealousy of Pulcheria and the suspicion of an affair with Paulinus, the master of the offices.

Around 443, Eudocia left the palace for reasons that cannot be fully ascertained. One rumor has it that Eudocia was banished from the court towards the latter part of her life for adultery. Theodosius suspected that she was having an affair with his long-time childhood friend and court advisor, Paulinus. According to Malalas's account of this story, Theodosius II had given Eudocia a very large Phrygian apple as a gift. One day Paulinus had shown the emperor the same apple, not knowing that the emperor had given it to Eudocia as a gift. Theodosius recognized the apple and confronted Eudocia who had sworn she had eaten it. Eudocia's denials made the emperor believe that she had fallen in love with Paulinus and was having an affair, and had given his best friend the same apple he had given to her as a symbol of his love. Theodosius had Paulinus executed and Eudocia, embarrassed, decided to leave the court in 443.

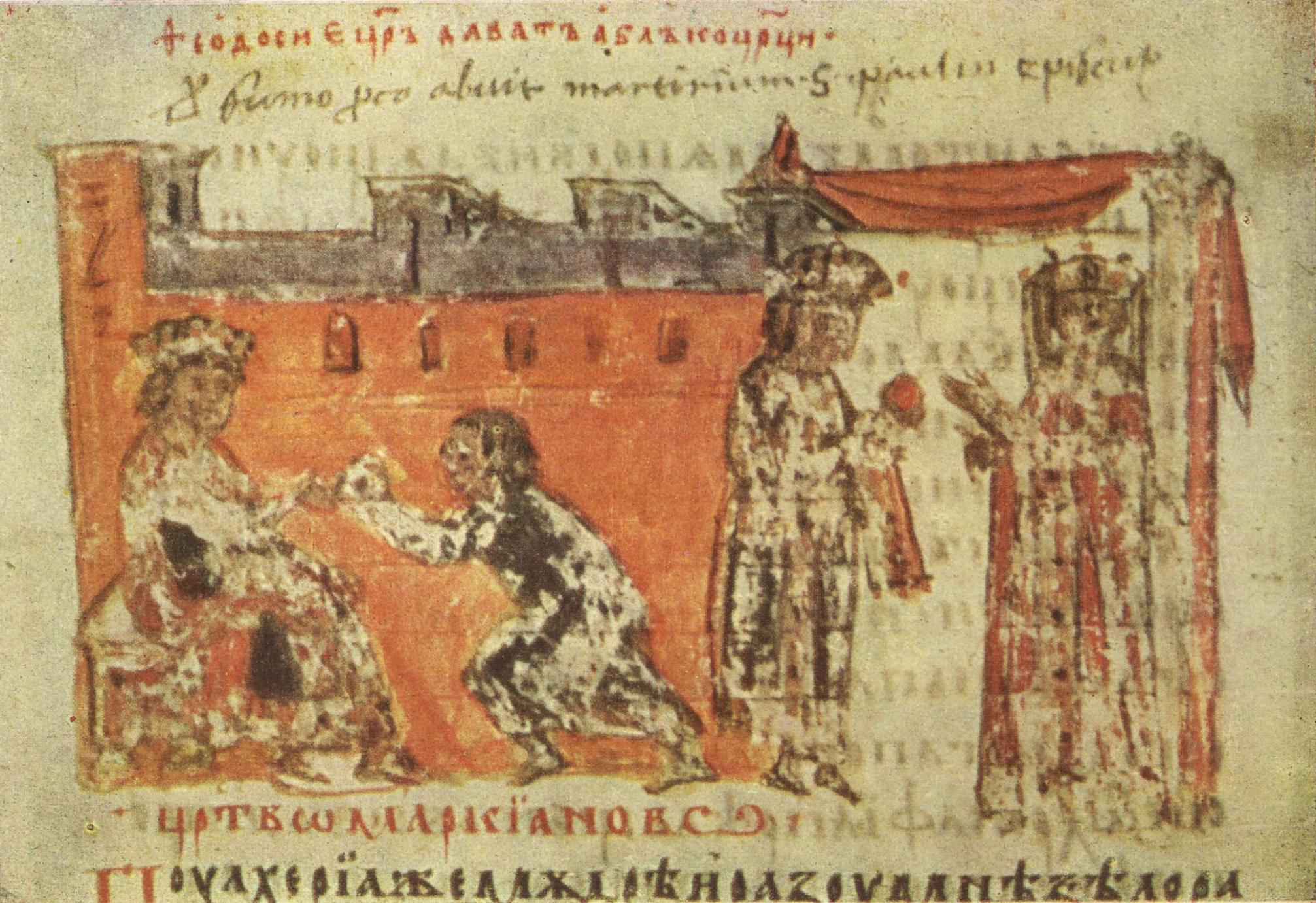
Theodosius II (left) receiving the Phrygian apple from Paulinus and then showing it to Eudocia. Scene from the 12th century Manasses Chronicle.

On the other hand, Marcellinus' version suggests intrigues of Theodosius and Eudocia against each other: on Theodosius' orders, comes domesticorum Saturninus killed two allies of the empress, and in revenge, she went on to have Saturninus assassinated. Theodosius subsequently deprived Eudocia of her royal attendants, prompting her to leave the palace. Whatever the cause of her departure may be, she still retained her wealth and the title Augusta.

=== In Jerusalem (443–460) ===
Eudocia returned to Jerusalem in circa 443, where she lived for the last part of her life. In Jerusalem she focused on her writing. She nevertheless retained great influence. She also rekindled her relation with her former ward Peter the Iberian as well as with Melania the Younger, a famous ascetic. She died an Orthodox Christian in Jerusalem on 20 October 460, having devoted her last years to literature. She was buried in Jerusalem in the Church of Saint Stephen, one of the churches she had herself built in Jerusalem; modern St. Stephen's Basilica now stands at the site. The empress never returned to the imperial court in Constantinople, but "she maintained her imperial dignity and engaged in substantial euergetistic programs."

== Literary work ==
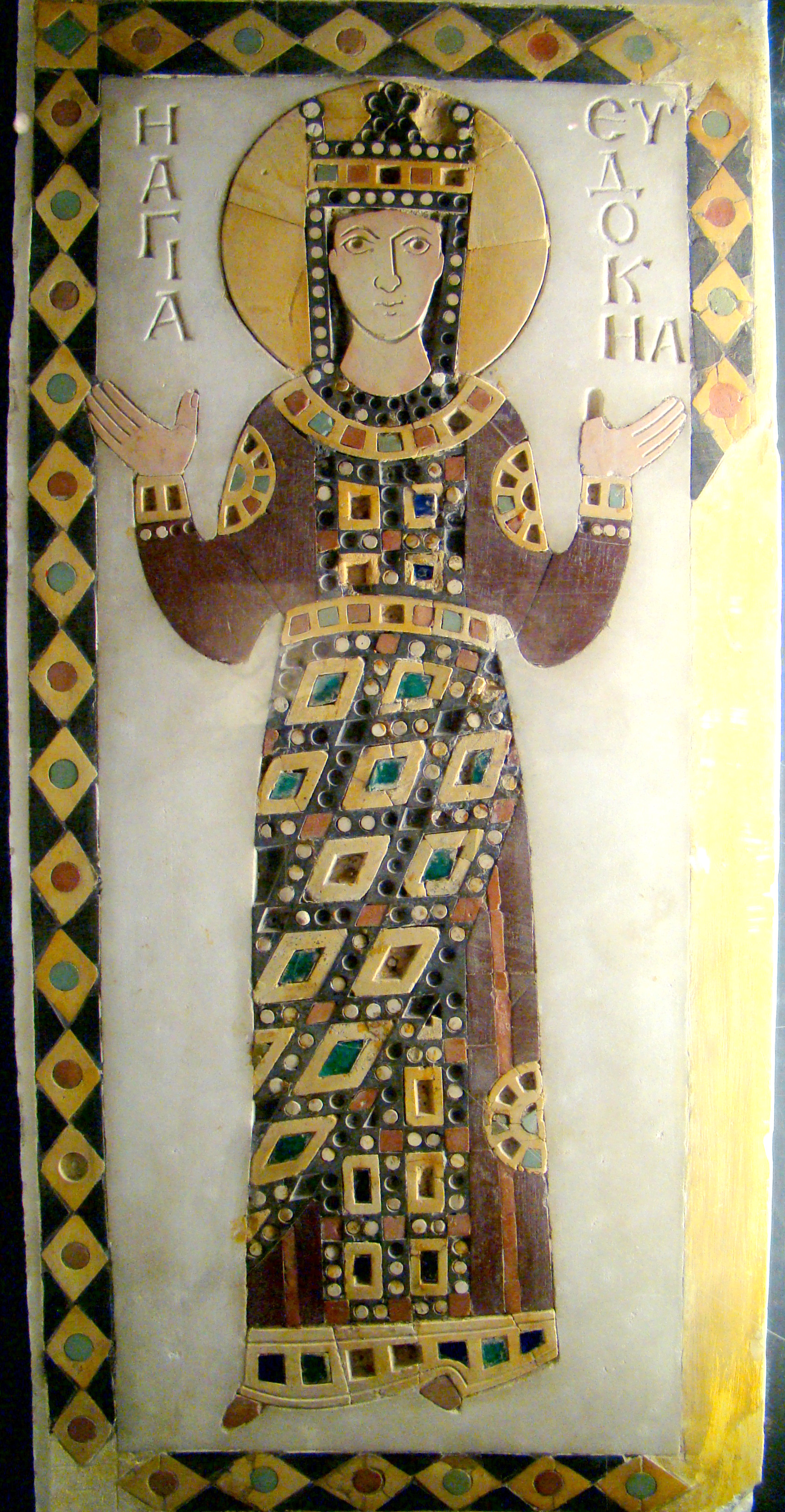
Eudocia in an 11th-century colored stone inlay on marble from church of Lips monastery (Fenari Isa Mosque), Fatih, Istanbul. Archeological Museum.

Eudocia was a prolific poet: though most of her work does not survive, almost 3,500 lines do, which is remarkable especially for a female poet of the time. Her literary style is reflective of the contemporary traditions of paraphrasing and her thorough sophist education. She wrote in epic hexameters on Christian themes. Her works which survive are her Martyrdom of St. Cyprian, an inscription of a poem on the baths at Hamat Gader, and her Homeric centos. The latter are her most well-known and studied poems, with analyses by scholars such as Mark D. Usher and Brian Sowers. Eudocia's poetry has received limited scholarly attention compared to her historical role as empress, though in recent years there has been increasing academic attention.

Photius provides crucial evidence for some of her poetry which was lost. In his catalogue of Eudocia's poetry, he mentions her eight-book paraphrasis of the Octateuch into epic hexameters and a paraphrasis in the same metre of the books of two prophets, Zachariah and Daniel. Photius praises her work as of remarkable quality.

=== Martyrdom of St. Cyprian ===
Eudocia's Martyrdom of St. Cyprian is a three book verse paraphrasis in epic hexameters of the conversions and martyrdoms of two Christian saints, Cyprian and Just(in)a, set in Antioch. Her poem is based on a prose hagiography in three parts: the Conversion, Confession and Martyrdom. Each part was written by a different anonymous author whose separate iterations were at some point combined in the manuscript tradition as three parts of the same story. Each part also survives in several different recensions; it is unclear which recensions were in Eudocia's exemplar, and most scholars agree that she used a copy which does not survive to us. The narrative is fictional; Common opinion dated the poem to the latter part of Eudocia's life, during her exile (c. 441–460): Livrea, however, criticises these arguments as illogical and dates the text to c.438–39 in alignment with her first pilgrimage to Jerusalem and visit to Antioch. The entirety of her first book survives (322 lines) alongside part of the second book (479 lines). A full translation of the text can be found in the appendix of Brian Sowers (2020) In Her Own Words: The Life and Poetry of Aelia Eudocia.

==== Book 1: The Conversion ====
The first book narrates the story of Justa, a young virgin in Antioch. Upon hearing a priest's sermon from her window, she falls in love with Christ. She criticises her parents' pagan faith and idolatry. That night, her father has a dream in which Christ entreats him to join his faith; he immediately takes his wife and daughter to church where they convert to Christianity.

Justa frequently walks between her house and the church to pray; a young man, Aglaïdas, sees her and instantly desires her. He sends people to Justa's house to propose marriage; she refuses, saying that her only suitor is Christ. Aglaïdas sends a band of men to take her, but the other church-goers rout them. He then attacks her, but she throws him on his back and tears at his face and clothes, drawing a direct parallel to the story of St. Thecla. Enraged, he turns to the magician Cyprian.

Cyprian summons three demons in his attempts to seduce Justa. The first two, armed with various charms and spells, cannot even enter her house; each time, Justa prays and makes the sign of the cross and the demon flees, terrified. The third demon summoned is Satan himself. Satan transforms himself into the guise of a young virgin, sits upon Justa's bed and attempts to persuade her to forsake her virginity. Justa almost leaves her house, but soon recognises the evil and routs Satan.

Satan returns to Cyprian who is shocked at Justa's power. Satan tells him that all demonic power is merely deception, that God has the only true power and how punishment awaits those who have sinned. Cyprian exorcises Satan and converts to Christianity. He rapidly rises in the ecclesiastic ranks, eventually becoming the Bishop of Antioch. He makes Justa a deaconess and renames her Justina.

==== Book 2: The Confession ====
What survives of the second book is a confessional speech in which Cyprian relates his childhood, upbringing and the events which led to his conversion.

He describes his early life, being dedicated to Apollo and undergoing numerous mythical initiations, including rites related to Mithras, Athena and Kore. He travels widely, gaining much esoteric knowledge about spirits, gods, the occult and deceptive magical arts. He masters divination and demonology and sees the monstrous, allegorical personifications of vices such as Hatred, Greed and Hypocrisy. He relates his first meeting with Satan, who flatters him and offers him demonic leadership. He presents all these experiences as impious and warns against the deceptive and corruptive influence of magic and demon worship.

He then relates his clash with Justa. Since the second part of the prose original was written by a different anonymous author than the first, there are numerous narrative discrepancies which do not align with the events of book one. His account details a more drawn out attack which spans over ten weeks, with legions of demons instead of just three. He narrates an occasion where he transformed Aglaïdas into a bird, who flew to Justa's house only to be struck down. Satan is given far more agency in this struggle, sending countless evils and even a plague onto the city. Cyprian's struggle of faith and conscience is presented as more gradual and complicated: he went to battle against the demons and questions their reliability several times before breaking with them completely. What survives ends with an audience member standing up to reply to his confession.

The rest of the narrative can be seen from Photius' summaries or the prose original. The man who replies to his speech entreats him to confess fully all of his sins, leading to an account of his most monstrous and horrific actions. He then repents, distributes his wealth to the poor, and fully embraces Christianity. Aglaïdas, too, converts and distributes his wealth to the poor. The lost third book would have narrated Cyprian and Justina's arrest and torture at the hands of the authorities and the emperor Diocletian. Eventually, they are beheaded beside a river and become martyrs.

==== Influences and scholarship ====
In her versification of the prose into hexameters, Eudocia was influenced by many previous ancient poets and authors. This poem represents her wider literary tradition of marrying her pagan upbringing and classical education with her Christian faith. Homer was a vital linguistic and thematic model for the poem. Other influences include Apollonius, Hesiod, the Greek romance novels, and later, imperial poets such as Oppian. The poem also contains numerous hapax legomena. Bevegni gives a general overview of her lexical influences, calling the poem a linguistic pastiche.

Eudocia's poetry has been understudied; though her work was praised in antiquity, historians writing about the empress disparaged her poetry as "laborious" or "uncouth and ignorant". The majority of attention has been from Italian scholars, particularly Claudio Bevegni. There has been increased attention to Eudocia's poetry in English scholarship, though writing about the Martyrdom is still scarce.

=== The Hamat Gader poem ===
The poem inscribed on the baths at Hamat Gader was very short, and can be included here, as evidence of her hexameter writing style. The poem was inscribed so visitors could read it as they went into the pool.

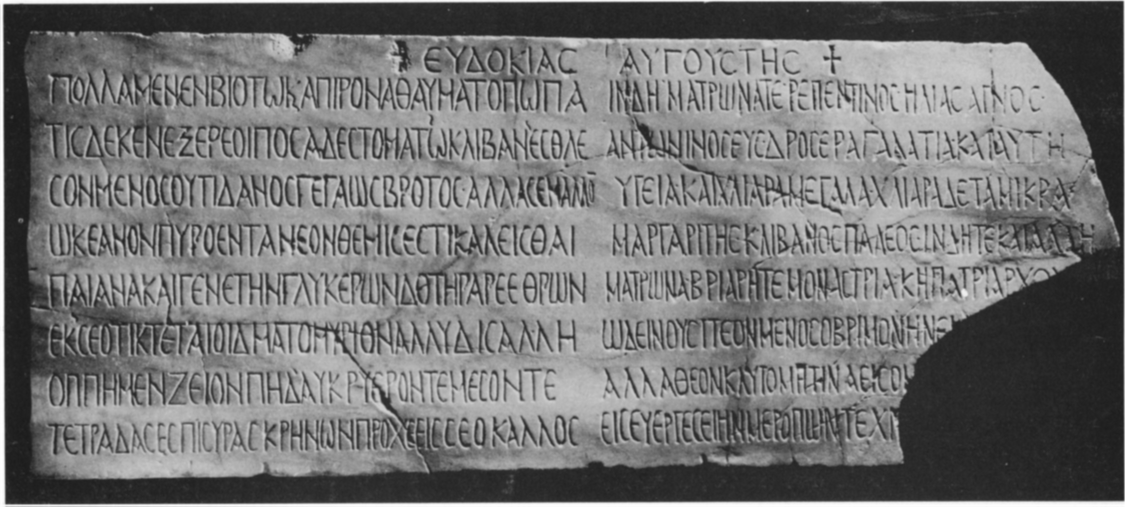
The inscription of the poem

I have seen many wonders in my life, countless,
But who, noble Clibanus, however many his mouths, could proclaim
Your might, when born a worthless mortal? But rather
It is right for you to be called a new fiery ocean,
Paean and parent, provider of sweet streams.
From you the thousandfold swell is born, one here, one there,
On this side boiling-hot, on that side in turn icy-cold and tepid.
Into fountains four-fold four you pour out your beauty.
Indian and Matrona, Repentius, holy Elijah,
Antoninus the Good, Dewy Galatia, and
Hygieia herself, warm baths both large and small,
Pearl, ancient Clibanus, Indian and other
Matrona, Strong, Nun, and the Patriarch's.
For those in pain your powerful might is always everlasting.
But I will sing of a god, renowned for wisdom
For the benefit of speaking mortals.

The line "Of the Empress Eudocia" flanked by two crosses is set above the poem. This title line was added after the carving of the main inscription, making room for some doubt whether the poem was indeed authored by Eudocia. Clibanus is the name given to the source of the hot water. After praising his qualities and those of his many springs ("the thousandfold swell"), the poem enumerates "four-fold four", thus sixteen different parts of the bath complex, fourteen of which bear a name; these names include Hygieia (the pagan goddess of health), a whole range of pagan personal names, "holy Elijah" referring to the prophet, and two refer to Christians – a nun and a patriarch.

=== Homeric centos ===
The Homeric centos that Eudocia composed are her most popular poems, as well as those most analyzed by modern scholars, because Homer was a popular choice on which to write a cento. Eudocia's centos are the longest Homeric centos, and consist of 2,344 lines. These centos are a clear representation of who Eudocia was, and what she believed in—an epic poem combining her Athenian classical educational background, but adding stories from the book of Genesis and the New Testament stories of the life of Jesus Christ. The most extensive surviving portion of Eudocia's work is 2,354 lines about Adam and Eve, based upon an incomplete poem by a man named Patricius.

Mark Usher analyzed this poem as a way to understand why Eudocia chose to use Homeric themes as a means to express her biblical interpretations. According to Usher, Eudocia needed to convey human experience relating to the Bible. She used themes from the Iliad and Odyssey because "they contained all Eudocia needed to tell the Gospel story. Whenever and wherever Eudocia needed to express greatness, pain, truthfulness, deceit, beauty, suffering, mourning, recognition, understanding, fear, or astonishment, there was an apt Homeric line or passage ready in her memory to be recalled." Some scholars view Eudocia’s Homeric poetry as a valuable lens into the identity of Christian women in the Eastern Roman Empire, and understanding her role as empress. Scholars have noted that her poetry reveals traces of classical education, including possible use of acrostics. She made a point to connect her background love for studying classical Greek literature to her Christian beliefs.

== Legacy ==
Eudocia is a saint. Her feast day is 13 August.

Eudocia has been described by modern scholars as a significant figure in the study of early Byzantine Christianity. Eudocia lived in a world where Greek paganism and Christianity existed side by side. According to Brian Sowers, Eudocia's work (including the Homeric centos and an epic poem on the martyrdom of St. Cyprian) has been mostly ignored by modern scholars, but her poetry and literary work are an example of how her Christian faith and paganism were intertwined, exemplifying a legacy that the Roman Empire left behind on the Christian world.

The plot of Antonio Vivaldi's opera Atenaide is based on the courtship and marriage of Eudocia and Theodosius.

Eudocia is a featured figure on Judy Chicago's installation piece The Dinner Party, being represented as one of the 999 names on the Heritage Floor, associated with the place setting for Theodora.

== See also ==
- List of Byzantine emperors
- List of Roman and Byzantine Empresses

Royal titles
| Preceded by Aelia Eudoxia | Roman Empress consort 421–450 | Succeeded by Pulcheria |
