= Gessius (praetorian prefect) =

Gessius (Greek: Γέσσιος, floruit 420–443) was a politician of the Eastern Roman Empire, brother of the Empress Aelia Eudocia.

== Life ==
Gessius was born in Athens, son of the pagan and sophist philosopher Leontius, and brother of Valerius and Athenais. In 421 Athenais changed her name in Aelia Eudocia and married the Emperor Theodosius II; as result, Valerius and Gessius received several honours. Gessius become Praetorian prefect of Illyricum, an office he probably lost after his sister lost her influence on the Emperor in 443 and went to Jerusalem.

== See also ==
- Gessia gens

== Sources ==
- Martindale, John R., ed. (1980). "Gessius 2". The Prosopography of the Later Roman Empire: Volume II, AD 395–527. Cambridge: Cambridge University Press. pp. 510–511. ISBN 0-521-20159-4.
