= John the Laz =

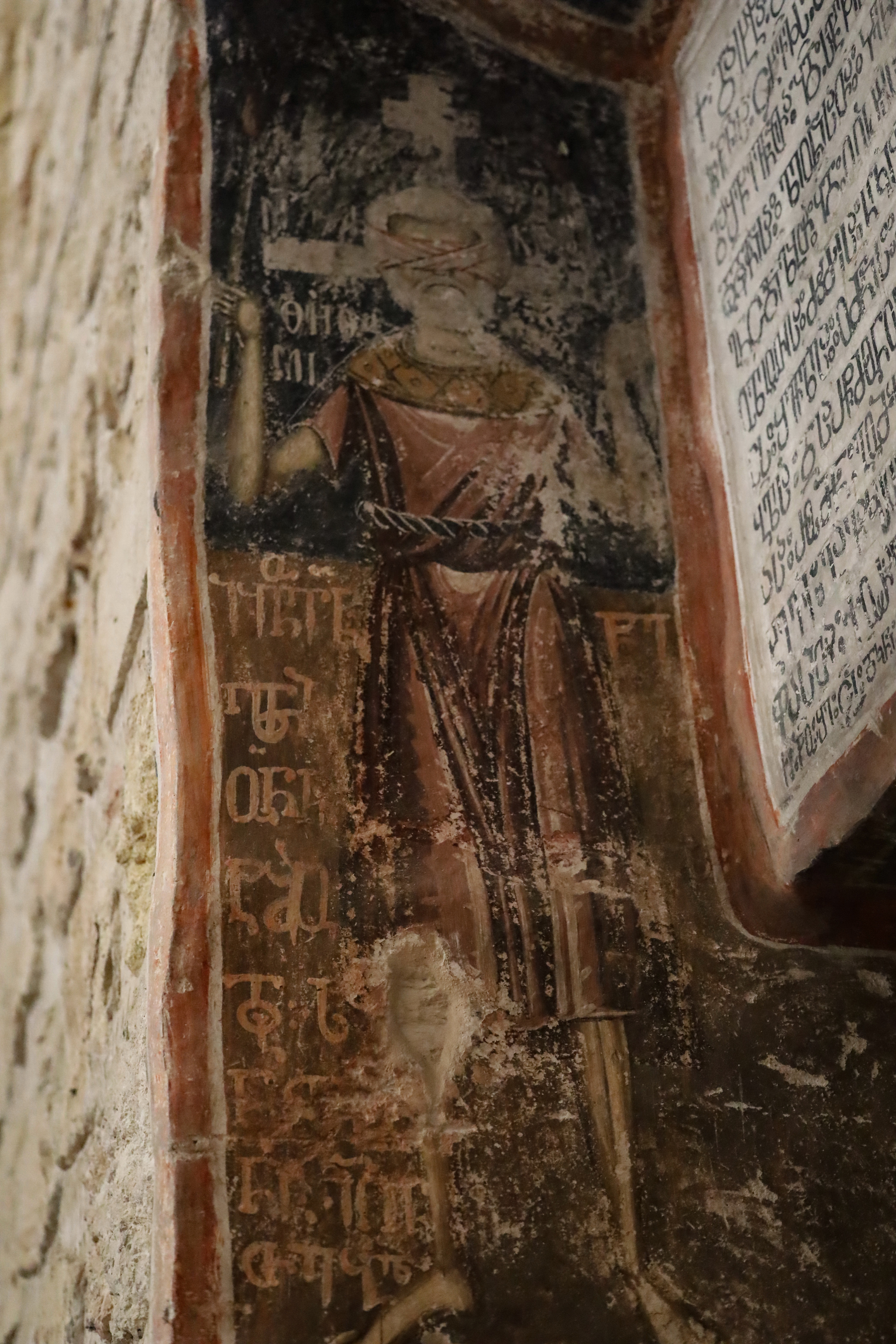
- Fresco of John at Monastery of the Cross
- Born: Lazica, Kingdom of Iberia
- Died: 463/465 AD; Gaza
- Controversy: Christology
- Influenced: Peter the Iberian
- Tradition or genre: Fathers of the desert

John the Laz (Georgian: იოანე ლაზი, romanized: ioane lazi; fl. 5th century) was a Georgian (Note: Georgians were the core nation in the Caucasus and their language widely dominated the communication in region's south, east and west since classical antiquity; it also became a major vehicle in Albania before its Persian annexation. Georgian monks abroad were mainly restricted to the area of Jerusalem and its vicinity and celebrated the liturgy in their own language.) eunuch official (cubicularius), monk and theologian of early Christianity and one of the key figures of monasticism in the Palestinian region. He was a tutor, life-long fellow and possible godfather of Peter the Iberian.

== Life ==
John was born as Mithridates in the region of Lazica, part of the Kingdom of Iberia during the reign of Vakhtang I. Mithridates was most probably a eunuch and chamberlain at the Roman royal court. He changed his name after he became a monk following his ordination. John, moved by the example of Saint Passarion of Palestine, he and his adept, another Georgian by birth, Peter the Iberian, whom he met in the Great Palace of Constantinople, decided to escape to Jerusalem and organize a monastery with a shelter for poor pilgrims, where they would engage in "uninterrupted praise and warship of God". They chose the place near the Tower of David. Per Vita Petri Iberi, "blessed fathers Peter and John went to the deserted place near the Jordan River, and built a monastery there". When a dispute arose with the neighbor concerning the monastery's property line, words came to blows, and neighbor punched John in his face. In c. 444, John, with Peter left Jerusalem for Gaza. Peter soon became a bishop of Gaza. John had a weak physical health and suffered from skin disease. He was affected with kind of herpes that broke out on his whole face. Peter, worried about his friend's health, took John to the Church of the Holy Sepulchre. Peter and John knelt down and prayed all night with "bitter tears and groans", and eventually, at dawn, John's face was completely cured with the "devine power of the holy cross".

John died in either 463 or 465. He was buried in a Georgian monastery, but it is unclear, whether in Jerusalem or in the Judean Desert, nearby Bir el Qutt, where the Georgian inscriptions were unearthed. Per Vita, John was buried in Peter's monastery between Gaza and Maiuma, where his regular commemorations were celebrated as well. Peter died in 491 in Jamnia; his disciples buried him next to John the Laz.

== Bibliography ==
- Rufus, John (V c.) The Lives of Peter the Iberian, Theodosius of Jerusalem, and the Monk Romanus; Cornelia B. Horn, Robert R. Phenix translation, ISBN 978-1-58983-200-8; Society of Biblical Literature, 2008
- Kirsten, Ernst (1990) Die Insel Kreta in vier Jahrtausenden: gesammelte Aufsätze, ISBN 978-90-256-0943-6; Hakkert
- Tchekhanovets, Yana (2018) The Caucasian Archaeology of the Holy Land, Armenian, Georgian and Albanian Communities Between the Fourth and Eleventh Centuries CE; ISBN 978-90-04-36555-1; Brill Publishers
