= Maiuma (city) =

Ancient town near Gaza, Palestine

- Place
- Location of Maiuma within Palestine
- Coordinates: 31°31′N 34°27′E
- State: State of Palestine
- Founded: 1st century BCE

Maiuma (also Maiumas or Maiouma, Maioumas) is one of the names of the main ancient port of Gaza, at times functioning as a separate city; the other ancient port of Gaza was Anthedon. Its remains are situated at present-day Rimal near Gaza City in the Gaza Strip.

== History ==
A "harbour of Gaza" is first documented in one of the Zenon Papyri, a business letter written in September 258 BCE.

In antiquity, Maiuma was one of the two ports of Gaza, serving as the Incense Road's principal emporium on the Mediterranean. Located near Gaza, it was simply called "the port of Gaza" in many early sources, for instance Strabo and Ptolemy referred to it as Gazaion limen. However, it was distinct from the city, which was located opposite it, and recognised as an independent city since the early Christian era. The Greek name Neapolis ("the new city") seems to have also been used in reference to it.

=== Nabataeans and Hasmoneans ===
The port of Gaza was at the end of the Nabataean spice and incense trade route, dealing in herbs, spices incense, drapery, glass and food. Goods arrived in the port on the backs of camels from Southern Arabia (the Kingdom of Sheba) through Petra, the Arava Valley and crossing the Negev Desert via Avdat. At the port of Gaza, these goods were dispatched to the European markets. Alexander Jannaeus's conquest of Gaza, which denied the Nabateans access to the port and trade with Rome, led Obodas to launch a military campaign against the Hasmonean king.

=== Roman and Byzantine periods ===
Maiuma was rebuilt after it was incorporated into the Roman Empire in 63 BCE under the command of Pompey Magnus and trade routes were reopened. Although the town grew to a community of no small importance with a population as high as 9,000 and increasingly sought independence of Gaza, it remained a dependent kōme (dependent settlement of a Greek polis).

During the reign of Constantine the Great, who granted Maiuma the status of a separate city, it received the name Konstanteia after the emperor's sister (or son). It has been suggested that Maiuma's residents "collectively opted to convert to Christianity" or that it made some sort of public declaration of its Christianity.

Under Emperor Julian, known as Julian the Apostate by Christians, it was downgraded and the name was changed to Maioumas, which can be seen as simply meaning "harbour place", or as "the part of Gaza towards the sea". As a consequence of this, it is associated by some with a pagan festival also called the Maiuma or Maiouma, however others consider the word "maiuma" or "maiouma" to have evolved to cover a much wider set of meanings by the time the port near Gaza was given this name, with no Maiuma festival in the original meaning of the word ever taking place there. Following emperors did not reverse Julian's decision, though they allowed Maiuma to maintain an independent bishopric.

== Christianity in Maiuma ==
Maiuma seems to have been an early center of the spread of Christianity, which may explain the treatment of its status by Constantine and Julian. Its population was said to have been largely Egyptian in origin. Gaza steadfastly held on to its pagan faith and withstood Christian missionary attempts, and as a result the first bishops of Gaza resided at Maiuma. As the city regained its independence from Gaza, for a certain period of time it had its own bishop, due to Gaza's relatively long resistance to the introduction of Christianity. The first known bishop of Maiuma was a certain Zeno from around 395 to after 400, mentioned by Sozomenus. Among others known are Paulianus (or Paulinianus), participant in the First Council of Ephesus in 431; Paul, who took part in the Second Council of Ephesus in 449; Peter the Iberian who was reluctant to serve in the office but was elected by the citizens in 452 nevertheless; John Rufus, his successor; and Procopius, chronologically the last known bishop of Maiuma, known to have participated in the Synod of Jerusalem of 581. Mention must also be made of St. Cosmas of Maiuma.

The city was famous for the fact that the tomb of a Saint Victor was located there; he had been an Egyptian martyr, but more about his identity is unknown.

Severus of Antioch, disciple of Peter the Iberian, founded a monastery in the vicinity of Maiuma around the year 500. According to the Life of Severus, written by Zacharias Rhetor, this was done after Severus received a substantial inheritance and the monastery of Peter had been converted from a laura to a coenobium. John Moschus mentions a laura that might be that of Severus in the early seventh century, however, the exact location of the monastery remains unknown.

=== Bishops of Maiuma ===
Constantine offered Christian Maiuma independence from pagan Gaza. Julian the Apostate reverted the administrative move, but after his reign Constantine's arrangement was restored, Maiuma eventually becoming the seat of an independent bishop. The first bishops of Gaza, not Maiuma, also resided at Maiuma. An incomplete list of bishops of Maiuma includes:

- Zeno, a monk who became the first known bishop of Maiuma, between the late 4th and the early 5th century (Trombley offers 395–400)
- Paulianus or Paulinianus, participant in the First Council of Ephesus of 431
- Paul, nephew of Juvenal, archbishop of Jerusalem, attendee at the Second Council of Ephesus of 449
- Peter the Iberian (c. 417–491), a Monophysite, had lived for several years at the monastery between Maiuma and Gaza, being dedicated to monastic life, but in 452, during the anti-Chalcedonian revolt in Palestine, the Christians of Maiuma had him ordained bishop by force. He remained nominally bishop for the rest of his life, but only stayed in Maiuma until 453, when he was expelled from the city.
- John Rufus, possibly Peter's successor and fellow Monophysite; according to his own claim in the title of his work, the Plerophoriae, but there is no other source to support it. He may have been consecrated bishop of Maiuma by the anti-Chalcedonians after the death of Peter the Iberian in 491.
- Procopius, chronologically the last known bishop of Maiuma, had participated in the Synod of Jerusalem of 581

According to other sources, there is another bishop of Maiuma we know of:

- St Cosmas of Maiuma (d. 773 or 794), appointed bishop of Maiuma in 743.

== Remains of Maiuma ==
Maiuma is identified with al-Mina, about 4 kilometers from Gaza towards the sea. Remarkable archaeological findings from the site include the mosaic floor of the Gaza synagogue representing King David with a lyre, dated to the early 6th century AD and discovered in the mid-1960s. The city appears to have been fortified, but the enclosure wall still seems hard to trace.

== See also ==
- Maiuma disambiguation page
- List of archaeological sites in the Gaza Strip

== Sources ==
- Realencyclopädie der Classischen Altertumswissenschaft, Band XIV, Halbband 27, Lysimachos-Mantike (1928), s. 610.
