= Binyamina-Giv'at Ada =

Town in northern Israel

Binyamina-Giv'at Ada בנימינה-גבעת עדה
- Local council

Hebrew transcription(s)
  - ISO 259: Binyamína – Gibˁat ʕada
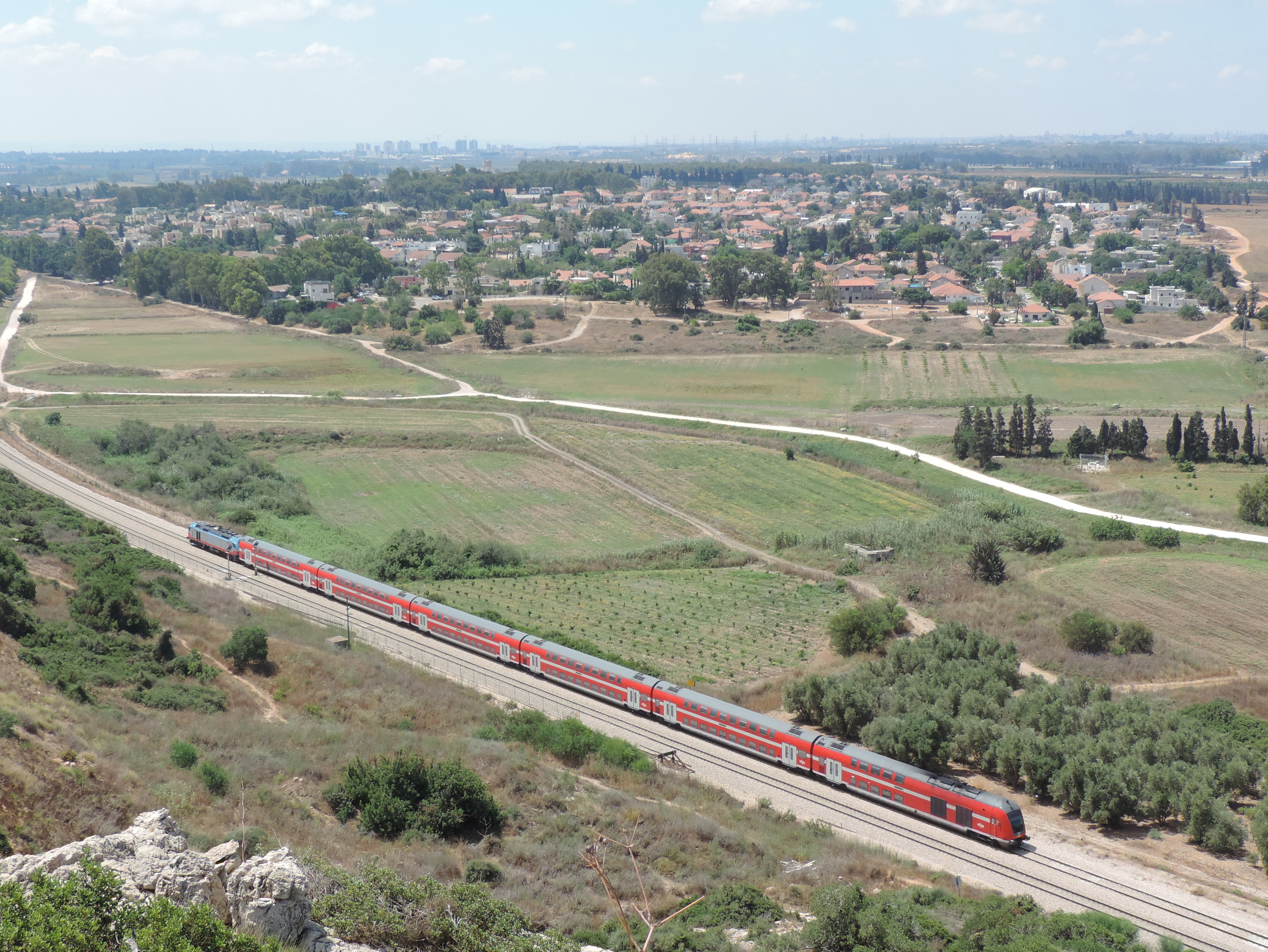
- View of Binyamina-Giv'at Ada

- Location within Haifa region of Israel Location within Israel
- Coordinates: 32°31′20″N 34°56′42″E
- Country: Israel
- District: Haifa
- Subdistrict: Hadera
- Natural Region: Hadera
- Founded: 2003 – merger

Government
  - Head of Municipality: Gil Hanania

Area
  - Total: 25.7 km^{2} (9.9 sq mi)

Population (2024)
  - Total: 15,566
  - Density: 606/km^{2} (1,570/sq mi)

Ethnicity
  - Jews and others: 99.8%
  - Arabs: 0.2%

Binyamina-Giv'at Ada (Hebrew: בנימינה-גבעת עדה) is a town in the Haifa District in northern Israel. It is the result of the 2003 merger between the two local councils of Binyamina and Giv'at Ada. In 2022, its joint population was 15,634. Before the merger, the population of Binyamina was 6,607.

== History ==
=== Binyamina ===
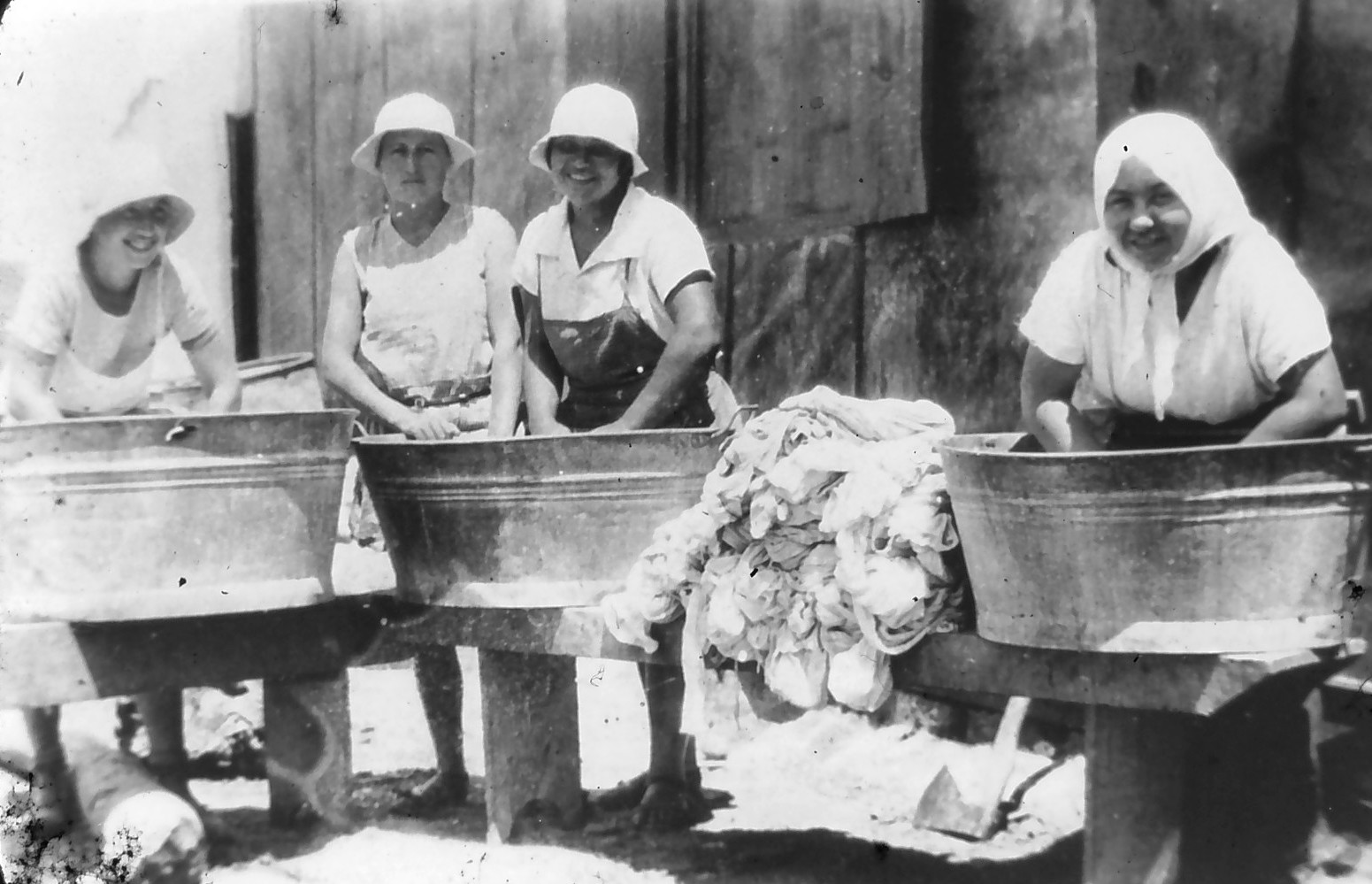
Pioneer women doing laundry in Binyamina, 1930

Binyamina was founded in 1922. At first, the proposed name for the Moshava was "Tel Binyamin", but as the nearby British railway station was called Binyamina railway station, which itself was named after the Baron Edmond Benjamin James de Rothschild, the inhabitants chose to call it Binyamina. Binyamina was founded on PICA land by members of the Third Aliyah and people from the neighboring Zikhron Ya'akov. According to a census conducted in 1922 by the British Mandate authorities, Binyamina had a population of 153 inhabitants, consisting of 137 Jews, 13 Muslims and 7 Christians. In 1946 the Betar Tower and Stockade settlement (which was relocated multiple times) "Nahalat Jabotinsky", named after Ze'ev Jabotinsky became a part of the Binyamina municipality. The original economy of the village was citrus-based and a jasmine refining factory for the French perfume industry. In 1947, Binyamina had a population of 2000.

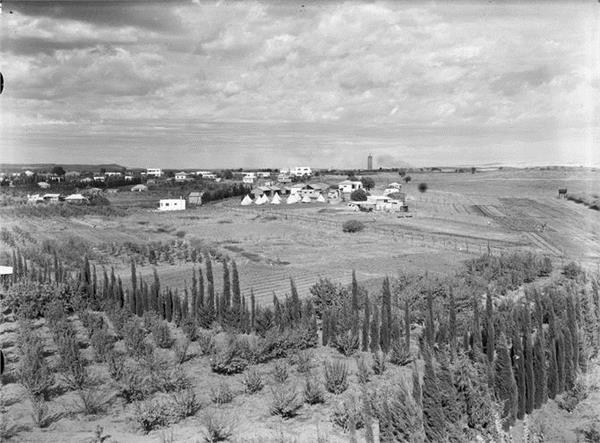
Binyamina 1928

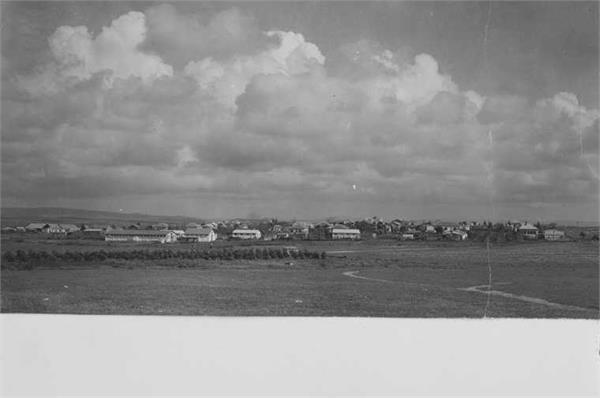
Binyamina 1934

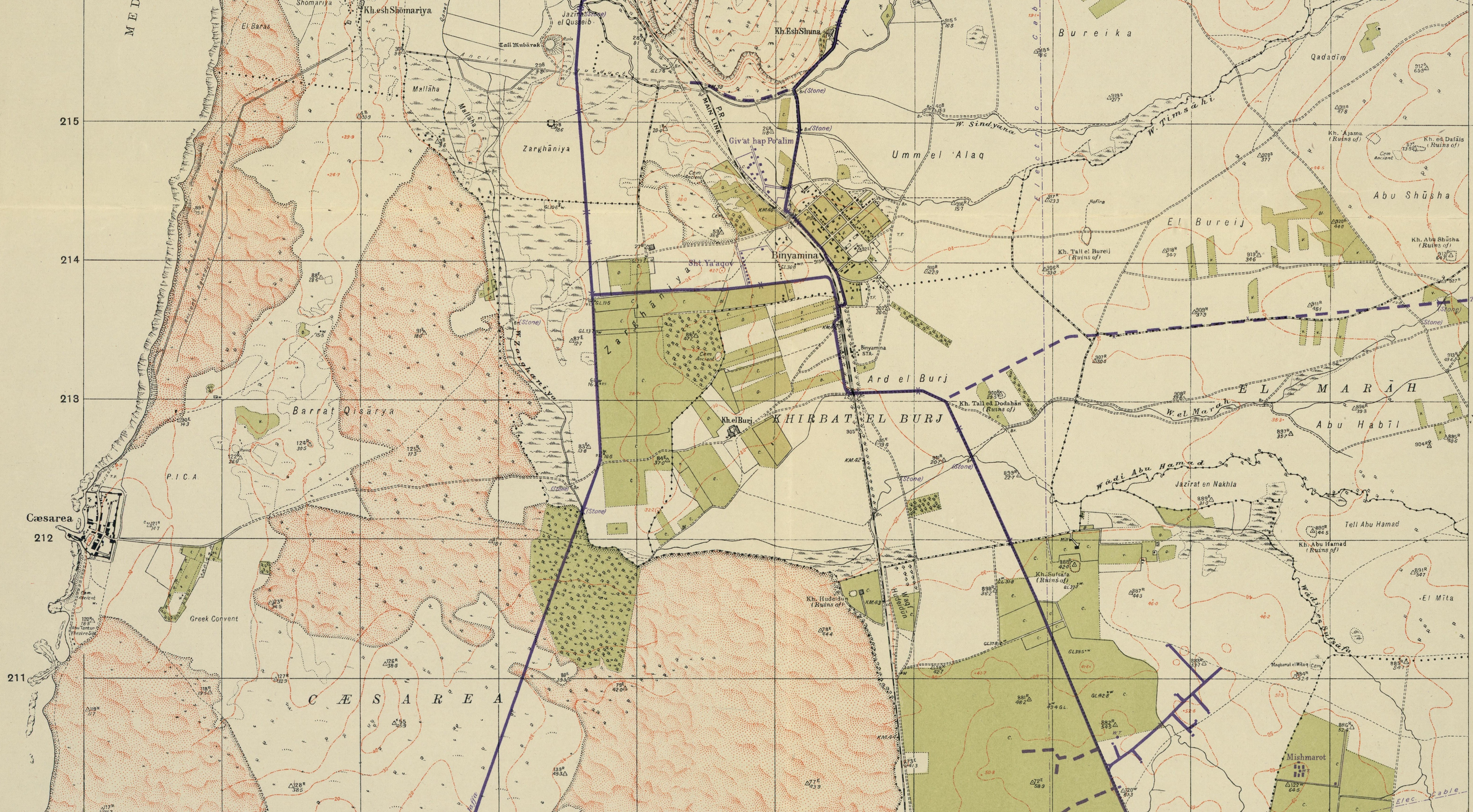
Binyamina 1942 1:20,000

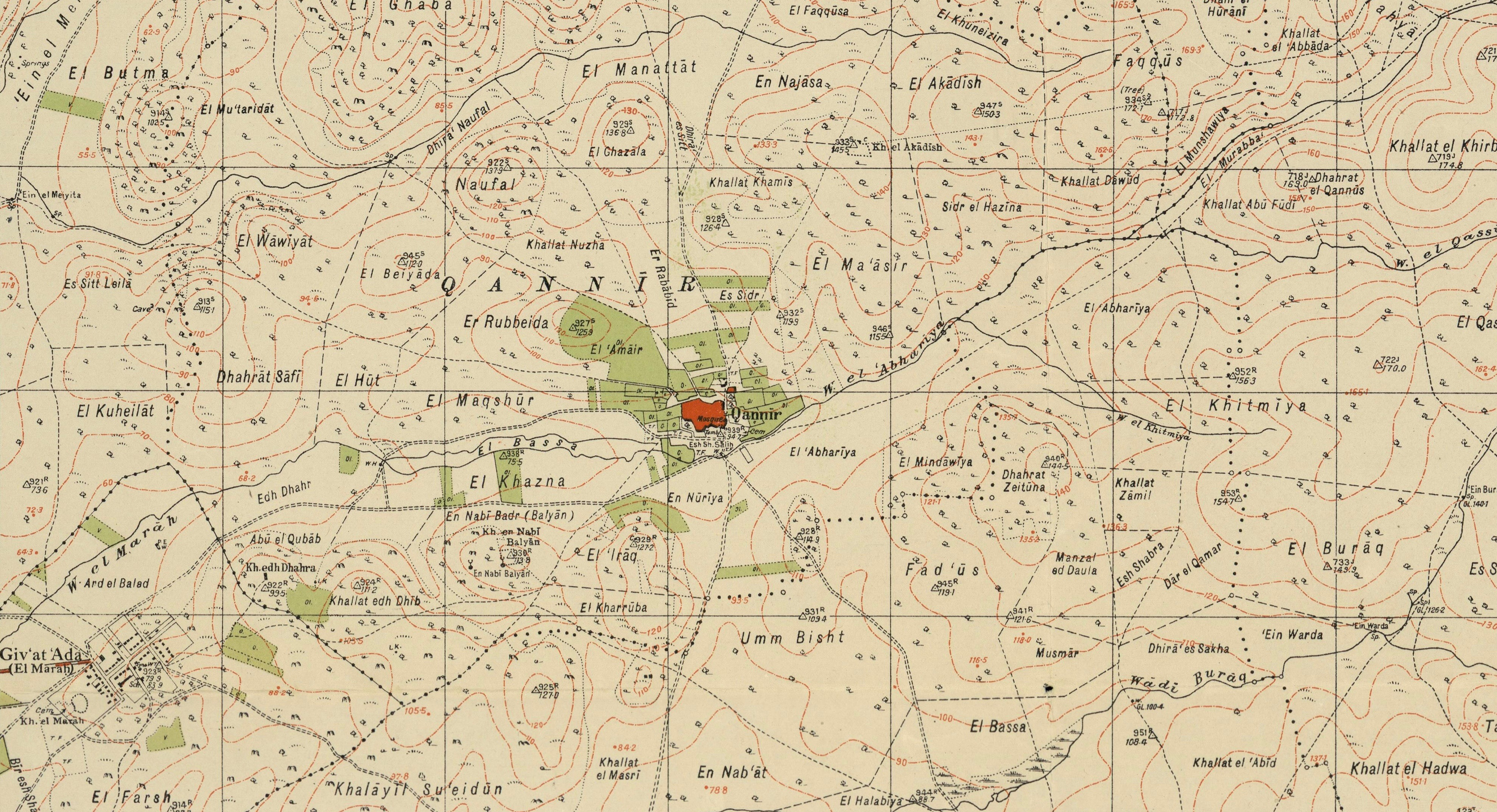
Giv'at Ada 1942 1:20,000 (bottom left)

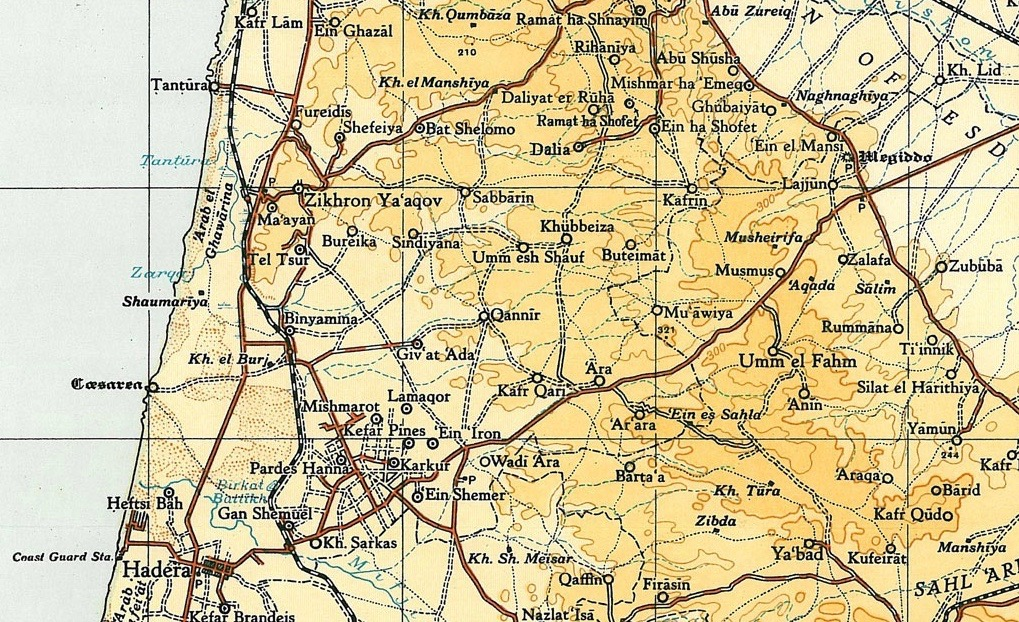
Binyamina & Giv'at Ada 1945 1:250,000

=== Giv'at Ada ===
Giv'at Ada, 'Ada Heights', named for Baron Edmond James de Rothschild's wife Adelheid/Adélaïde (Ada), was established in 1903 by eight families from Zikhron Ya'akov. Giv'at Ada was established as an agricultural Moshava. The main farming branches were field crops and vegetables, and later grapes.

=== Merger ===
The two local councils, Binyamina and Givat Ada, were merged into one authority as part of an initiative by the Ministry of the Interior regarding the unification of local authorities in Israel. The unification was carried out in 2003 as part of the plan for the revival of the Israeli economy. From the beginning, there was an intention to unite the three settlements into one authority: Zichron Ya'akov, Binyamina, and Givat Ada. Finally it was decided in the Knesset on July 31, 2003, to unify Binyamina and Givat Ada only.

On 13 October 2024, a Hezbollah drone attacked a military base of the Golani Brigade near the town, killing 4 IDF personnel and injuring 67 people, with several critically wounded.

== Archaeology ==
In June 2026, archaeologists engaged in a salvage dig on the outskirts of Binyamina discovered two intact 1,700-year old marble busts depicting Roman figures, one of them possibly Lycurgus.

== Economy ==
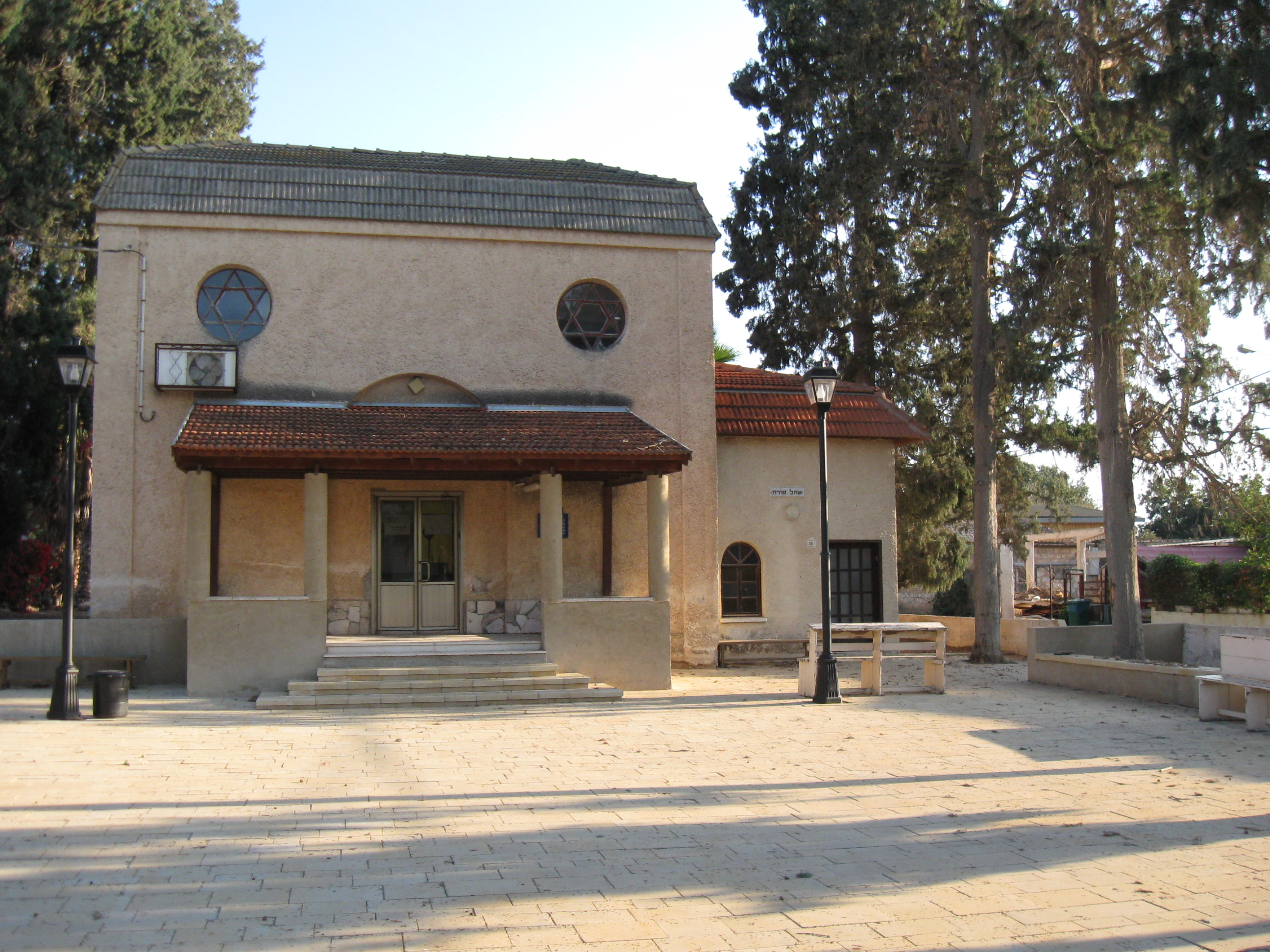
Historic Giv'at Ada synagogue

The area is home to both the Binyamina Winery, producers of 2.8 million bottles of wine annually, and the Tishbi Winery, founded by Yonathan Tishbi in 1985. As of 2009, Tishbi produced approximately one million bottles per year. Plans have been drawn up to build a 150-acre (0.61 km^{2}) wine park on the slopes between Binyamina and Zichron Ya'akov to promote wine tourism in Israel.

== Shuni ==
The Jabotinsky Park at Shuni contains a Roman theatre with an adjacent semicircular pool used during the Graeco-Syrian pagan Maiumas water festival of Roman Syria, and buildings of the former Arab Palestinian hamlet of Khirbat al-Shuna.

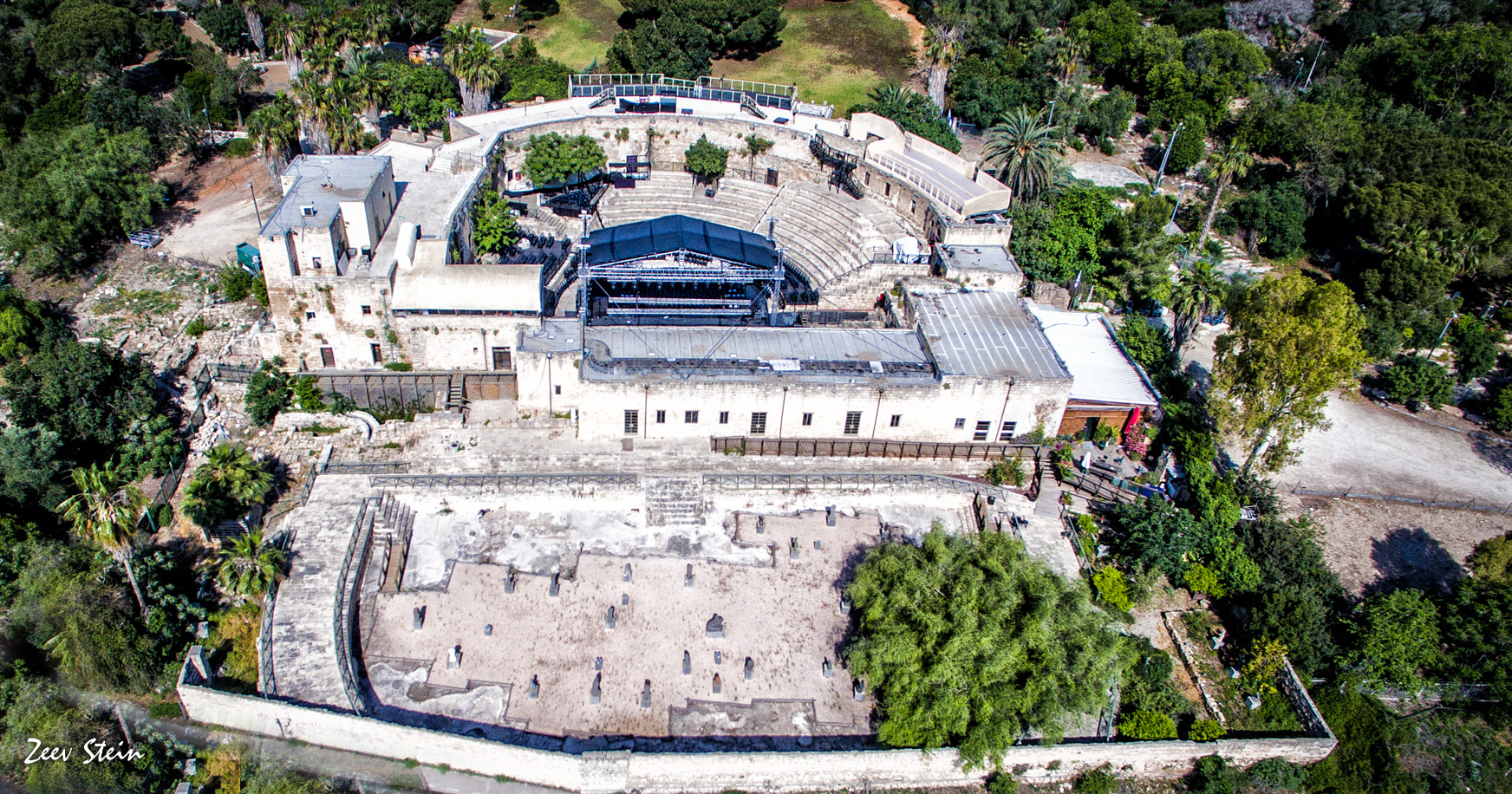
The "Shuni Amphitheater", actually a restored Roman theatre backed by a pool

The ancient village of Kefar Shumi or Shami stood close to the springs at the foot of the Carmel ridge whose waters were sent to Caesarea Maritima by aqueduct. In 1902, it was known in Arabic as Shuni and Mayumas.

== Transport ==
The Israel Railways Binyamina Railway Station is the last stop on the Binyamina-Tel Aviv suburban line and a transfer point on the Tel Aviv-Haifa intercity line, which makes it a transportation hub for the area. A direct non-stop train from Binyamina reaches Tel Aviv or Haifa in 30 minutes.

== Population ==
Historical population
Year	Pop.	±%
1972	2,800	—
1983	3,000	+7.1%
1995	4,600	+53.3%
2008	12,000	+160.9%
2022	15,268	+27.2%
2024	15,566	+2.0%

According to the data of the Central Bureau of Statistics, as of the end of January 2023 (estimate), 16,343 residents live in Binyamina-Givat Ada (124th place in the ranking of local authorities in Israel). The population is growing at an annual growth rate of 1.8%. The percentage of those who earned a Bagrut certificate among 12th-grade students in the year 2020-2021 was 88.1%. The average monthly salary of an employee during the year 2019 was 13,552 NIS (national average: 9,745 NIS).

== Voting Patterns ==
In the 2022 election, 73 percent of voters in Binyamina-Giv'at Ada voted for the parties of the center-left coalition led by Yair Lapid, while 24 percent voted for the parties of the right-wing coalition led by Benjamin Netanyahu and 0.7 percent voted for the Arab parties.

In the 2026 election, 74 percent of voters in Binyamina-Giv'at Ada voted for the parties of the center-left coalition led by Gadi Eisenkot, while 19 percent voted for the parties of the right-wing coalition led by Benjamin Netanyahu and 0.7 percent voted for the Arab parties. An additional 3.3 percent voted for the Reservists, and 1.9 percent voted for Amcha Yisrael. Voter turnout increased 20 percent from the 2022 election.

== Notable residents ==
Binyamina is the birthplace of the Israeli songwriter Ehud Manor, and is referenced in a number of his songs. It is also the birthplace of the 12th Israeli Prime Minister Ehud Olmert, and basketball player Adi Gordon. Amongst its current residents are famous TV actor Lior Halfon, former Maccabi Haifa F.C. Maor Buzaglo

== Twin towns – sister cities ==
Binyamina-Giv'at Ada is twinned with:

- Tokaj, Hungary
