= Maiuma (festival) =

Ancient religious water festival celebrated in May

Maiuma, Maiouma
- Celebrations: Theatrical and aquatic performances: games, mime shows, nude swimming
- Date: During May

Maiuma or Maiouma, also written with a final s (Ancient Greek: Μαϊουμᾶς), was a Graeco-Syrian nocturnal water festival celebrating Dionysus and Aphrodite and held during the month of May-Artemisios. According to Malalas (Chronicle 284–285), it was celebrated in Antioch every three years as a nocturnal festival, also known as Orgies, or the Mysteries of Dionysus and Aphrodite. Its most famous venue was Daphne-by-Antioch (Daphne, a suburb of the Hellenistic metropolis on the Orontes). Aquatic displays, mime and dance shows made the festival very popular in several cities of the East Roman Empire. There are scholars who distinguish between the original Graeco-Syrian festival, characterised by two main components, water and rejoicing, and later celebrations of similar character from the pagan Graeco-Roman and even the Christian Byzantine world, which also adopted the original name. The celebrations were so licentious that some Roman rulers attempted to ban them.

== Origin and etymology ==
There is no information about the original purpose of Maiuma.

=== Malalus' "folk etymology" ===
Malalus of Antioch in Syria, a 6th-century Byzantine author from Syria, probably a native Syriac speaker but writing in Greek, saw the name Mayumas as a word derived from the name of the month of May, when the festival was held.

=== Ancient Semitic origin theory ===
Robert M. Good's 1986 thesis is that the Punic word mayumas (my'ms), which occurs in a small number of inscriptions from Carthage, is a calque after the Greek term hydrophoria (see Merriam-Webster entry here) and therefore means "rites of water movement", based on his etymological interpretation - mai = water, yumas = carry, thus suggesting that mayumas was a water carrying ceremony. Good notes that "[f]estivals of water movement were common in the ancient Syro-Palestinian world" and sees a Canaanite- Phoenician- Carthaginian tradition as very likely. While elaborating on the possible character of a range of Syro-Palestinian water movement rites, which could be associated with the Carthaginian mayumas festival, he warns that these cannot be more than speculations due to the limited findings. However, the name itself, an awkward composition in Punic, is still perfectly plausible as a calque after the Greek term, which places the time of its adoption sometime between the conquest of Phoenicia by Alexander the Great in 332 BCE and the fall of Carthage in 146 BCE, given that the inscriptions were found there.

R.M. Good also mentions an Athenian Anthesteria, a Dionysian festival containing hydrophoria rites, and the fact that such rites, connected to libations, were widely known in the Mediterranean world. Good dismisses Malalus' explanation for the word Mayumas as derived from the month of May as folk etymology, which he sees as a result of the fact that by Malalus' time, the connection to the Phoenician/Punic parent word for water, may-, and the composite word based on it, had been thoroughly forgotten.

American Phoenician language scholar, Philip Schmitz, similarly suggests that the Punic word my'ms is derived by word combination from the Semitic word for water and the Greek name of the spring festival, Μαιουμα(ς), 'Maiouma(s)'.

=== Alternative meanings: water festival or harbour ===
Nicole Benayche (2004) shows how the word -- probably of Semitic origin and later Graecised, maybe also as a play of words on the Greek maia -- came to denote in the Greek and Roman world two different things: either spring festivals, both water-related and pleasant, but with no deeper connection to the Graeco-Syrian mysteries, so for instance the one at Ostia; or the harbour of a city, as for instance at Alexandria in Egypt, where the term referred to the island of Pharos. Ptolemy (2nd c. CE) and Marcus Diaconus (in Gaza 395-420) explain the word as simply meaning a maritime city quarter.

== History ==
Emperor Commodus (r. 177–192), when he renewed by edict the Olympic Games, earmarked revenue originating in certain ceremonies for financing the Maiumas rituals.

Malalas, writing in the 6th century, relates that the festival was held in his city of Antioch every three years and lasted for 30 days. An inscription from al-Birketein at Gerasa from the end of that century however mentions the festival being held there annually several years in succession.

== Cities holding Mayouma festivals ==
Authors like Nicole Benayshe are warning against the mistake of conflating the Greco-Syrian festival with later water-centered celebrations, as well as using the widely used toponym Maiuma, which often occurs as a common noun for harbour or seaside quarter, as proof for that city hosting the nocturnal mysteries. She notices the wide popularity of events held next to the water in later periods, accompanied by the construction of dedicated buildings.

Ancient literary sources explicitly mention three places where ceremonies called Mayoumas took place: Antioch, Ostia and Constantinople. Both the description of what the 3rd-century source refers to as "Mayoumas" in Rome and Ostia, and the context of the 8th-century Constantinople "Mayoumas", show little commonality with the Greco-Syrian theatrical and mystic rituals. John of Lydia describes how in May the merchants of Rome made vows to Maia and her son Hermes asking for good fortune in their trade, which they called "making the Mayouma", went to Ostia and pushed each other into the sea, enjoying themselves. In 777, Emperor Leon IV celebrated his victory over the Arabs and "made a Maiouma" in the Sophianae baths in Constantinople. Jayoung Che sees this late Maiouma event as a continuation of polytheistic pleasure-centered rituals well into the Christian era.

Epigraphic evidence of Mayoumas festivities were found in Nicea (a 3rd century inscription), Tyre, and Gerasa (from 535). Only in the case of Tyre do we have the term used both as a toponym and as the name of a festival.

Apart from Antioch with its suburb, Daphne, several other locations in the East Roman Empire are known as venues for the festival, such as Shuni-Maiumas (now in Binyamina, Israel), where a semicircular pool built behind the stagehouse of a theatre offered the main venue for the water festival; Gerasa (today's Jerash in Jordan), where it was centered on a site little outside the city walls known today as al-Birketein, an Arabic name meaning "the double pool", which aptly describes its main feature; and Aphrodisias in Caria, Asia Minor, where a 5th-century honorific inscription near the open pool of the southern agora mentions the governor who acted as maioumarchès, presiding over the festivities.

Maiumas or related festivals were also allegedly held at 'Ain Baki, Gaza (but see word of caution by Benayche, who refutes it), Ashkelon, Jerusalem, Hierapolis and perhaps at Homs, Baalbek, Botnah near Hebron and Dura Europus. One should not apply though the toponymic argument, for instance in the case of "civitas Maiuma Ascalonitis" recorded in the 6th century, which A. Negev and N. Benayche read as 'the port of Ascalon'.

== As toponym ==
Michael Avi-Yonah and Shimon Gibson are mentioning four places named after the festival, starting with Maiumas, the port of Gaza.

The Anonymous pilgrim of Piacenza mentions in the 570s a place called Maiumas on the coast near Ashkelon, perhaps today's Khirbat al-Ashraf at the entrance to the Shikma Valley/Wadi Sikrayr.

The archaeological site known in Arabic as Khirbat Miyāmās has preserved in its name the memory of the ancient festival and has been identified with the 3rd-century Kfar Shumi or Shami mentioned in the Jerusalem Talmud. Today located at Shuni near Binyamina east of Caesarea Maritima, it was still hosting the pagan water games during the early Byzantine period.

The 6th-century Madaba Map shows the town of "Betomarsea also called Maiumas" in the vicinity of Charachmoba (today's al-Karak), a place ancient sources connect to Baal-Peor of Numbers 25:3–9, with "Betomarseas alias Maioumas" understood as "the house of Marzeah (Semitic name: Bēṯ Marzēaḥ) or Mayumas", where marzea(h) is seen as a Semitic idolatrous form of worship.

== Moral reactions ==
The aquatic shows and pagan religious activities raised the ire of both Jewish rabbis and Christian holy men, who considered the popular feast to be licentious. From an outraged John Chrysostom we learn about mimes swimming naked in the theatre and Joshua the Stylite, a Syriac chronicler, writes about nocturnal festivities held at the end of the 5th century in Edessa in mid-May, both probably relating to Maiumas celebrations.

== See also ==
- Maiuma disambiguation page
- Floralia, ancient Roman religious festival held in April
- May Day, today's May festival
- May Queen, British personification of the May Day holiday
- Roman festivals
- Rosalia, a festival of roses celebrated throughout the Roman Empire
