= Peter the Iberian =

Georgian philosopher and saint

Saint Peter the Iberian
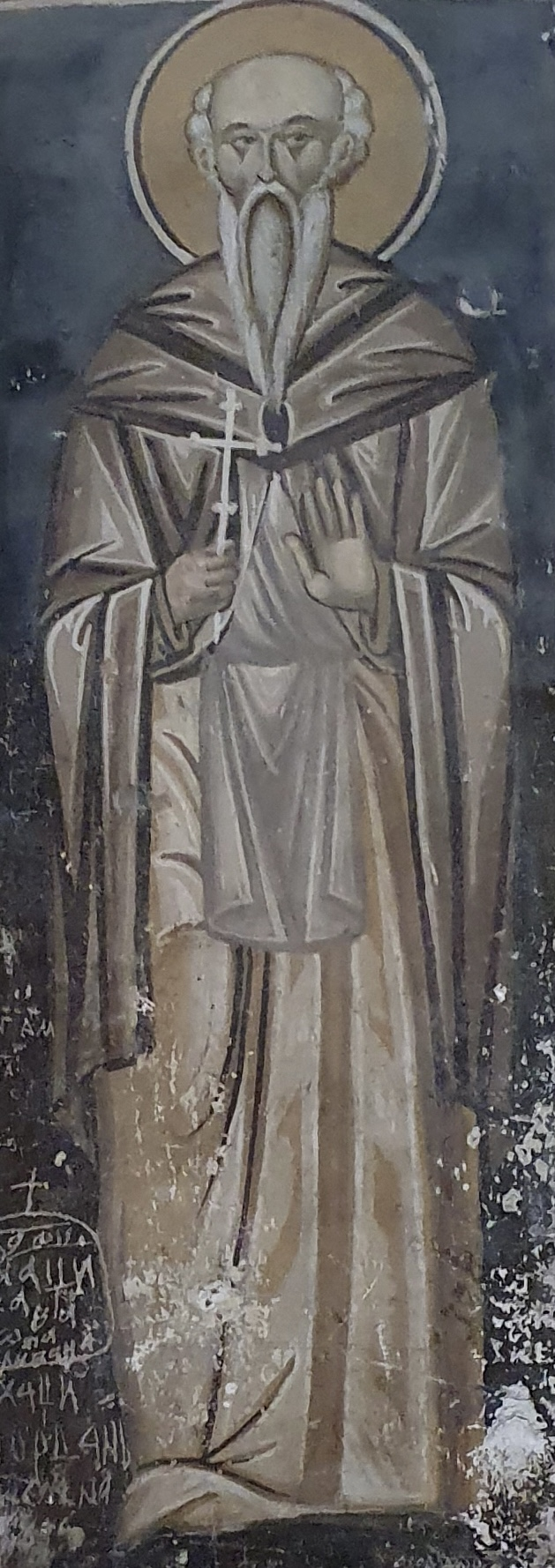
- Fresco of Peter the Iberian at the Monastery of the Cross in Jerusalem

Bishop of Maiuma
- Born: c. 417; Kingdom of Iberia
- Died: 2 December, 491; Yavne-Yam, Palaestina Prima
- Venerated in: Eastern Christianity
- Feast: 27 November & 1 December (Syriac Christianity); 1 Koiak (Oriental Orthodoxy)
- Controversy: Christology
- Influences: Zeno the Prophet, John the Laz
- Influenced: Severus of Antioch, John Rufus
- Tradition or genre: Desert Fathers

Peter the Iberian (Georgian: პეტრე იბერი, romanized: p'et're iberi) (c. 417–491) was a Georgian royal prince, theologian and philosopher who was a prominent figure in early Christianity and one of the founders of Christian Neoplatonism. Some have claimed that he is the author known conventionally as Pseudo-Dionysius the Areopagite.

His accomplishments include founding the first Georgian monastery in Bethlehem and becoming the bishop of Maiuma near Gaza. The oldest Georgian Bir el Qutt inscriptions mention Peter with his father.

== Life ==
=== Early life in Iberia, Constantinople and Jerusalem ===
Peter was born into the royal Chosroid dynasty of the Kings of Iberia (Eastern Georgia) and was initially named Murvan (alternatively, Nabarnugios), Prince of Iberia (Kartli). His father, King Bosmarios of Iberia, invited noted philosopher Mithridates from Lazica (also called John the Eunuch and John the Laz) to take part in Murvan's education. For a time, the child was kept hidden so as not to be delivered as a hostage to the Persians.

In 423, at the age of about five, the prince was sent as a political hostage to Constantinople to ensure the loyalty of Iberia to the Byzantines rather than to the Persians. Here he received a brilliant education under a personal patronage of the Roman empress Aelia Eudocia, wife of Theodosius II. When he was about twenty, the young prince, together with his mentor Mithridates, left the palace and made a pilgrimage to Palestine. It remains uncertain whether they had planned to return to Constantinople or if this was an escape, nevertheless their presence in Jerusalem was commonly known and they were not forced to return.

In Jerusalem, they were received by Melania the Younger, a famous ascetic whom Peter had met earlier in Constantinople and who might have inspired him to follow her. Melania bestowed upon them the monastic garb in a ceremony in the Anastasis and they became monks at her monastery on the Mount of Olives under their new names Peter and John. Peter also brought with him relics of the Persian martyrs, which were interred in a martyrion build by Melania on the mountain, the ceremony being conducted by the patriarch Cyril of Alexandria. Peter had also brought with him money which served to build their own monastery (later called the monastery of the Iberians) and which after some time they converted into a hostel for pilgrims.

=== In Gaza and Maiuma ===
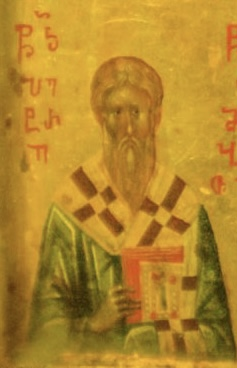
Peter on a triptych at Saint Catherine's Monastery

It was the monk Zeno, called the Prophet, who recalled them to their monastic life and upon whose advice they departed to a monastery between Gaza and Maiuma. There, Zeno became Peter's spiritual guide and Peter became acquainted with the monastic circles in the region. According to his biographer, John Rufus, Peter refused to write to or receive letters from home lest it undermine his ascetic discipline. At some point around 445, the bishop of Maiuma ordained Peter though Peter attempted to avoid serving as a priest in favour of monastic life.

In 452, he was consecrated bishop of Maiuma by Patriarch Theodosius. He only served for six months before some Christians were banished by the decree of the local ruler.

=== Escape to Egypt; return to Palestine ===
Peter escaped to Egypt, where he found refuge in the Enaton.

In the early 470s, Peter moved to Peleia near Ascalon where he continued ascetic activities, visiting various towns and villages of Palestine. Here he acquired great fame as a holy Father. He was called "pillar of Orthodoxy", "Great Peter", "the second Apostle Paul", "the second Moses" and "an exceedingly wonderful person". He gained numerous followers and disciples. According to the medieval sources, he was an author of several famous religious works. However, none of them survived to be written under the name of Peter. For three years he lived at the hermitage of Hilarion, then for some time in a shack on the seashore near Azotus before moving on an estate at Yavneh-Yam, the port of ancient Iamnia, formerly belonging to Eudocia and now managed by a follower of his. He died there in 491 and was buried in his monastery near Gaza.

== Position vs. Chalcedonian creed ==
From approximately the 13th century, following the translation of his biography from Syriac, Peter the Iberian was regarded in the Georgian Orthodox Church as a Chalcedonian saint, with his feast day observed on 2 December. In modern times, however, his name is no longer included in the Georgian Church calendar. Among Georgian Orthodox theologians, opinions differ: some continue to view him as Chalcedonian, while others consider him a Miaphysite. The Armenian and Coptic Churches consider him Miaphysite and anti-Chalcedonian. Although his biographies do not discuss this issue, some scholars, particularly those relying on Armenian sources, support the view that Peter the Iberian was anti-Chalcedonian. For example, David Marshall Lang argued that it is possible he was a Miaphysite, whereas Shalva Nutsubidze and Ernest Honigmann emphasize his role as a Neoplatonic philosopher rather than assigning him a specific Christological position.

== Biographies ==
- The so-called Syriac version of John Rufus in Greek original, dates back to the 8th century. John Rufus (John of Beth Rufina) was Peter's disciple and later his successor as bishop of Maiuma.
- The so-called Georgian version originally written by Peter's contemporary, Zacharias Rhetor, bishop of Mytilene, in Greek has been preserved as a manuscript of circa the 13th century.

== See also ==
- Severus of Antioch
- Culture of Georgia
