= John Rufus =

Fifth-century priest and historian

Saint John Rufus
- Bishop of Maiuma

Personal details
- Born: Arabia Petraea
- Denomination: Oriental Orthodox Christian

Sainthood
- Feast day: 20 March Julian calendar (11 Paremhotep in the Coptic calendar)
- Venerated in: Coptic Orthodox Church and Syriac Orthodox Church

John Rufus, John of Beth Rufina (also spelled Ruphina), John, Bishop of Gaza, or John of Maiuma (born c. AD 450), was an anti-Chalcedonian priest of Antioch, a disciple of Peter the Iberian and an ecclesiastical historian who possibly served as the bishop of Maiuma. He wrote the Plerophoriae, the Life of Peter the Iberian, and the Commemoration of the Death of Theodosius. He is canonized in the Coptic Orthodox Church under the name of "John, Bishop of Gaza," venerated on 11 Paremhotep.

== Life ==
Almost everything that we know about John Rufus originates in his own work, with a few more details from the Life of Severus by Zacharias Scholasticus. John's name is derived from the fact that he was a monk from the Monastery of Beth Rufina.

John was born in the province of Arabia (see Plerophoriae 22) around AD 450 and studied jurisprudence at the exclusive law school of Berytus (modern-day Beirut), where his fellow student, Theodore of Ascalon, brought him into contact with his future spiritual master, Peter the Iberian. Evgarius, Rufus' younger brother, also studied law at Berytus and showed much interest in the values of religion and monasticism. John became a monk and left for Antioch, where he was ordained as a priest by the city's anti-Chalcedonian patriarch, Peter the Fuller, during the reign of Emperor Basiliscus (r. January 475 – August 476). Upon the return to power of Emperor Zeno and the expulsion of Peter the Fuller in 477, John moved to Palestine in 479, where he became a disciple of Peter the Iberian and joined his monastic community located between Gaza and Maiuma. Here he became one of Peter's intimate students, which would allow him to give firsthand evidence of the last twelve years of his teacher's life. As a native of the province of Arabia, a region he knew in detail, as proven by the section of the Life dealing with Peter the Iberian's travels through that province, John Rufus might have acted there as Peter's guide. At Peter the Iberian's death in 491, he passed on the leadership of his monastery to four of his disciples, most prominently to Theodore of Ascalon, while John Rufus became the priest of the monastery church. Whether John Rufus did become the bishop of Maiuma, as mentioned in the title of the Plerophoriae, cannot be supported with other sources; he might have been consecrated as such by the anti-Chalcedonians after the death of Peter the Iberian. After Peter's death, the anti-Chalcedonian party in Palestine might have seen in John Rufus their new spiritual leader.

== Work ==
Three works are ascribed to John Rufus: the Plerophoriae, the Life of Peter the Iberian, and the Commemoration of the Death of Theodosius. Only the authorship of the Plerophoriae is clearly stated in the text, while the surviving manuscripts of the other two works do not indicate any author. Still, the wider consensus is that these are all works of John Rufus. The three works are all written in a very similar spirit, and were apparently composed during the few favourable years for anti-Chalcedonians during the reign of Emperor Anastasius (r. 491–518).

=== Plerophoriae ===
Plerophoriae, lit. "Reassurances", is John's most famous work. A collection of dreams and visions, anecdotes and brief episodes describing miracles, it had the purpose of promoting Monophysitism and proving that God Himself condemned the resolutions of the Council of Chalcedon. One topic touched upon is the dilemma of an anti-Chalcedonian believer after the quashing of the short-lived Monophysite revolt: can they stay attached to a holy site regained by the Chalcedonians without becoming collaborators of, and entering into and communion with the enemy of their true faith? John Rufus' answer is: no.

The work was probably composed between 512 and 518, and text analysis offers indications that it was most likely written during the patriarchate of Severus of Antioch (512–538). This was the last of John's three works. Although an anthology of stories that, in their majority, already existed and had been included in a number of other texts or compilations, it became the most popular among these works, a fact that led to the term describing the type of stories it contained, plerophoriae, to become the title by which it is known today.

Scholars are sure that John Rufus wrote Plerophoriae in Greek, but just a few fragments in the original language have come down to us. Instead, translations into Syriac have survived in two complete manuscripts, as well as fragments in Coptic translations preserved in three codices and a manuscript.

=== Life of Peter the Iberian ===
The vita of Peter the Iberian is widely attributed to John Rufus, although it is anonymous. In it Peter is presented as the very model of an anti-Chalcedonian holy man. It was written around the year 500 as a work of propaganda formally presented as a hagiography. Cornelia B. Horn and Robert R. Phenix are convinced, based on the treatment of the topic and style of the vita, that it has been put to paper at the first anniversary of Peter's death, that is: in 492.

Peter's evolution goes from a young enthusiastic pilgrim, to a believer in the ideal of xeniteia, or disconnection from the physical, ephemeral world, even by detaching himself from relics and holy places. John Rufus presents Peter the Iberian as a more theologically uncompromising anti-Chalcedonian than does another one of his disciples, Zacharias Rhetor, who describes him as a more moderate Monophysite.

After Peter's death, his unassuming laura is transformed by his disciples into a coenobium, all usual buildings of a monastery are constructed at the site, and Peter's relics are translated under the altar of the monastery church.

=== Commemoration of the Death of Theodosius ===
The Commemoration is another anonymous work attributed to John Rufus.

Theodosius was the anti-Chalcedonian ascetic leader raised by the Monophysite revolt onto the bishop's throne of Jerusalem between 451 and 53. During this time he consecrated Peter of Iberia as bishop of Maiuma, and only after also being reordinated as priest by Theodosius did Peter take up priestly activities. Theodosius was removed from his position by the man he had managed to replace for a while, bishop and, after the Council of Chalcedon, patriarch Juvenal of Jerusalem. After fleeing to Antioch Theodosius was taken to Constantinople and imprisoned for the rest of his life in a monastery by imperial orders.

== Bibliography ==
- Steppa, Jan-Eric (2004). "Heresy and orthodoxy: the anti-Chalcedonian hagiography of John Rufus". In Bitton-Ashkelony, Brouria; Kofsky, Arieh (eds.). Christian Gaza in Late Antiquity. Jerusalem Studies in Religion and Culture, volume 3. BRILL. ISBN 9789004138681.
- Bitton-Ashkelony, Brouria; Kofsky, Aryeh (2006). The Monastic School of Gaza. Supplements to Vigiliae Christianae. BRILL. ISBN 90-04-14737-3. ISSN 0920-623X.
- Orlandi, Tito (1991). "CE:1366a-1366b". In Atiya, Aziz Suryal (editor-in-chief) (ed.). John of Mayuma. Coptic Encyclopedia. Vol. 4. Macmillan (original print edition), Claremont Graduate University. School of Religion (digital edition).
- Moss, Yonatan (2016). Incorruptible Bodies: Christology, Society, and Authority in Late Antiquity. Christianity in Late Antiquity (volume 1) (reprint ed.). University of California Press. ISBN 9780520964341.
- John Rufus (2008). Horn, Cornelia B.; Phenix, Robert R. (eds.). John Rufus: The Lives of Peter the Iberian, Theodosius of Jerusalem, and the Monk Romanus. Writings from the Greco-Roman World. Society of Biblical Literature. ISBN 978-1-58983-200-8.
