= Hiereia =

Ancient Greek female priestess title

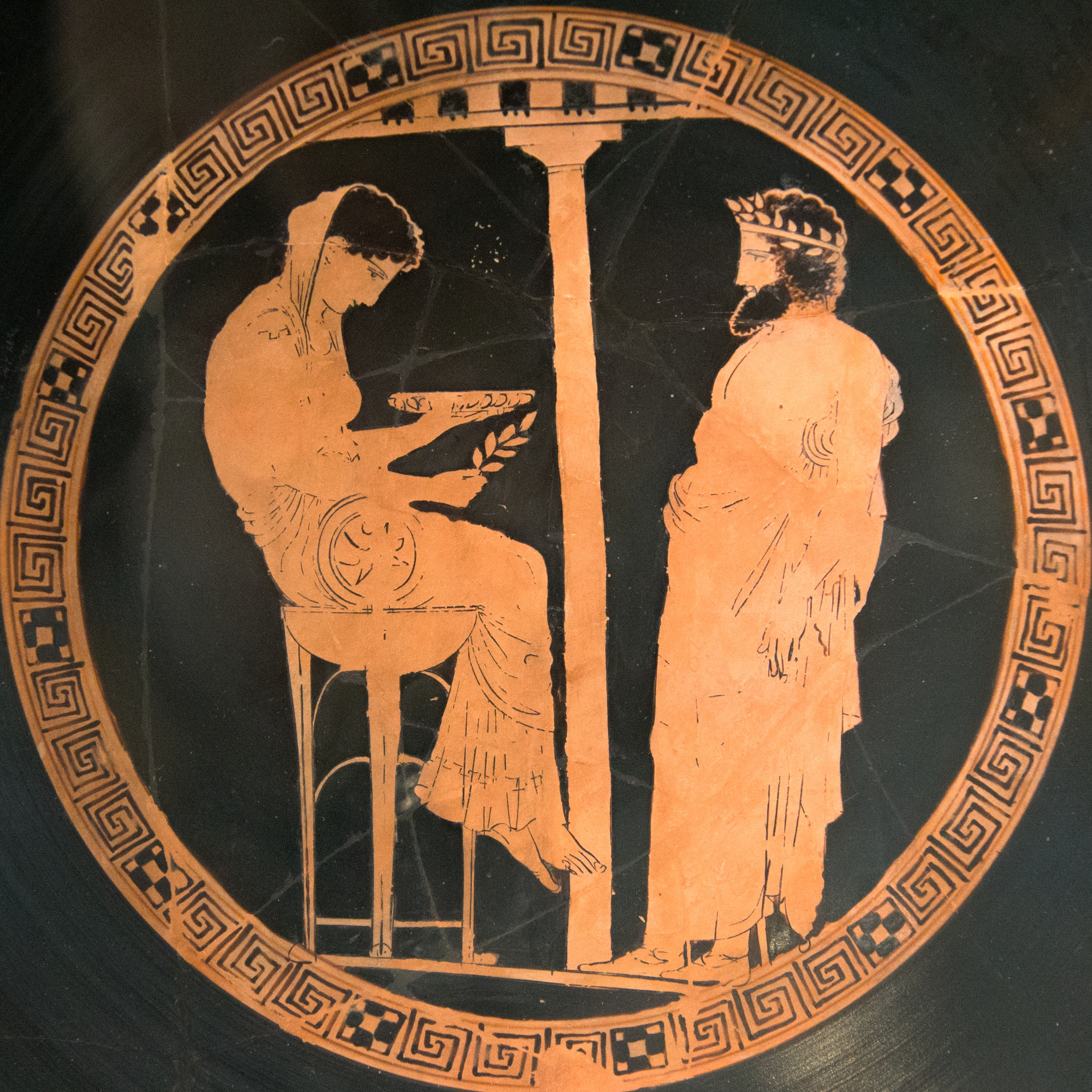
The Pythia, or Oracle of Delphi, the perhaps most known type of Hiereiai, red-figure kylix, 440–430 BC, Kodros Painter, Berlin F 2538, 141668

Hiereia (Ancient Greek: ἱέρεια, pl. ἱέρειαι, hiéreiai) was the title of the female priesthood or priestesses in ancient Greek religion, being the equivalent of the male title hiereus (ἱερεύς). Ancient Greece had a number of different offices in charge of worship of gods and goddesses, and both women and men functioned as priests. While there were local variations depending on cult, the Hiereiai had many similarities across ancient Greece. Normally, their office related only to a specific sanctuary or Greek temple.

== Requirements ==
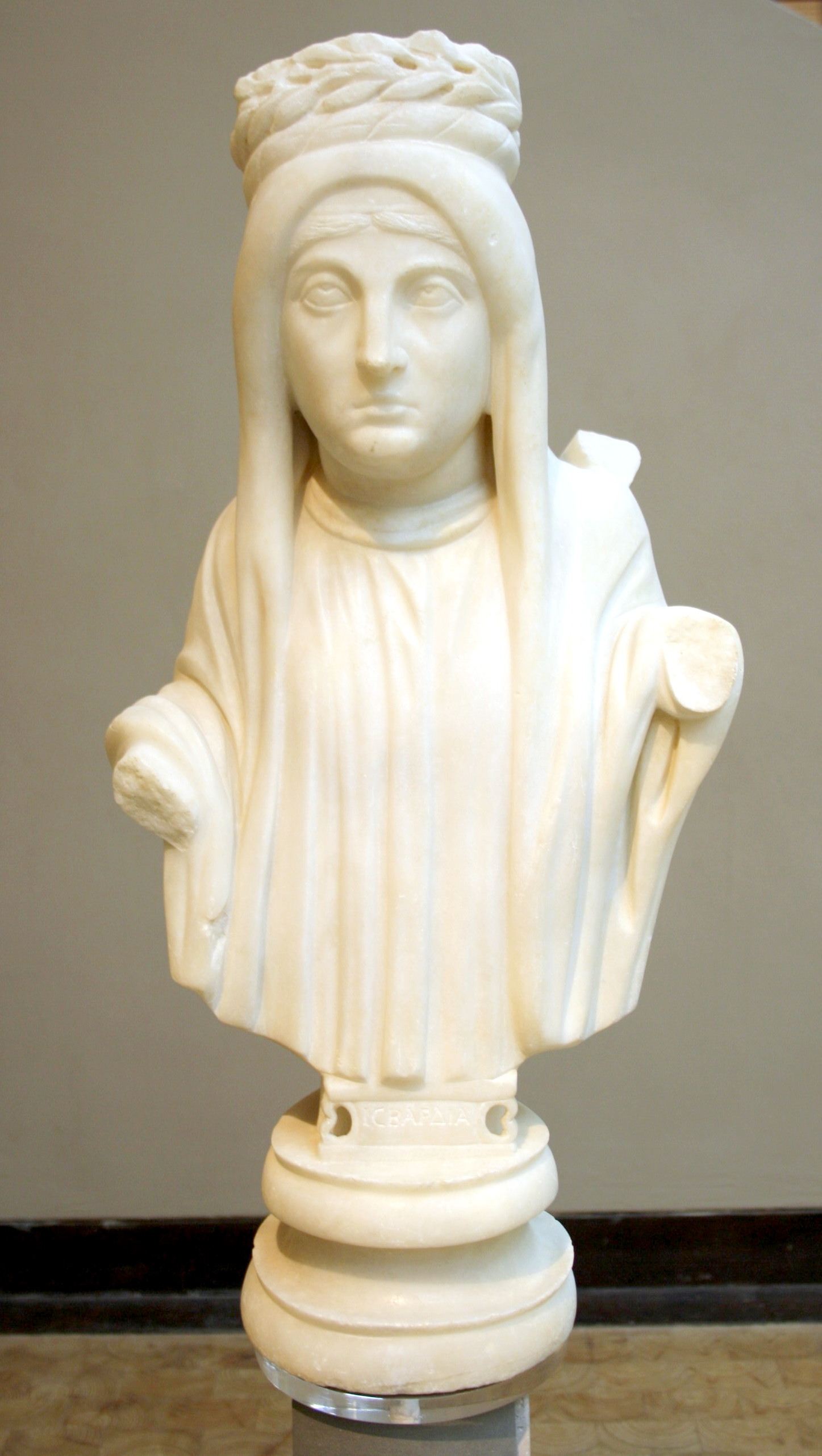
1842 – Byzantine Museum, Athens – Priestess Isvardia (4th century) – Photo by Giovanni Dall'Orto, Nov 1

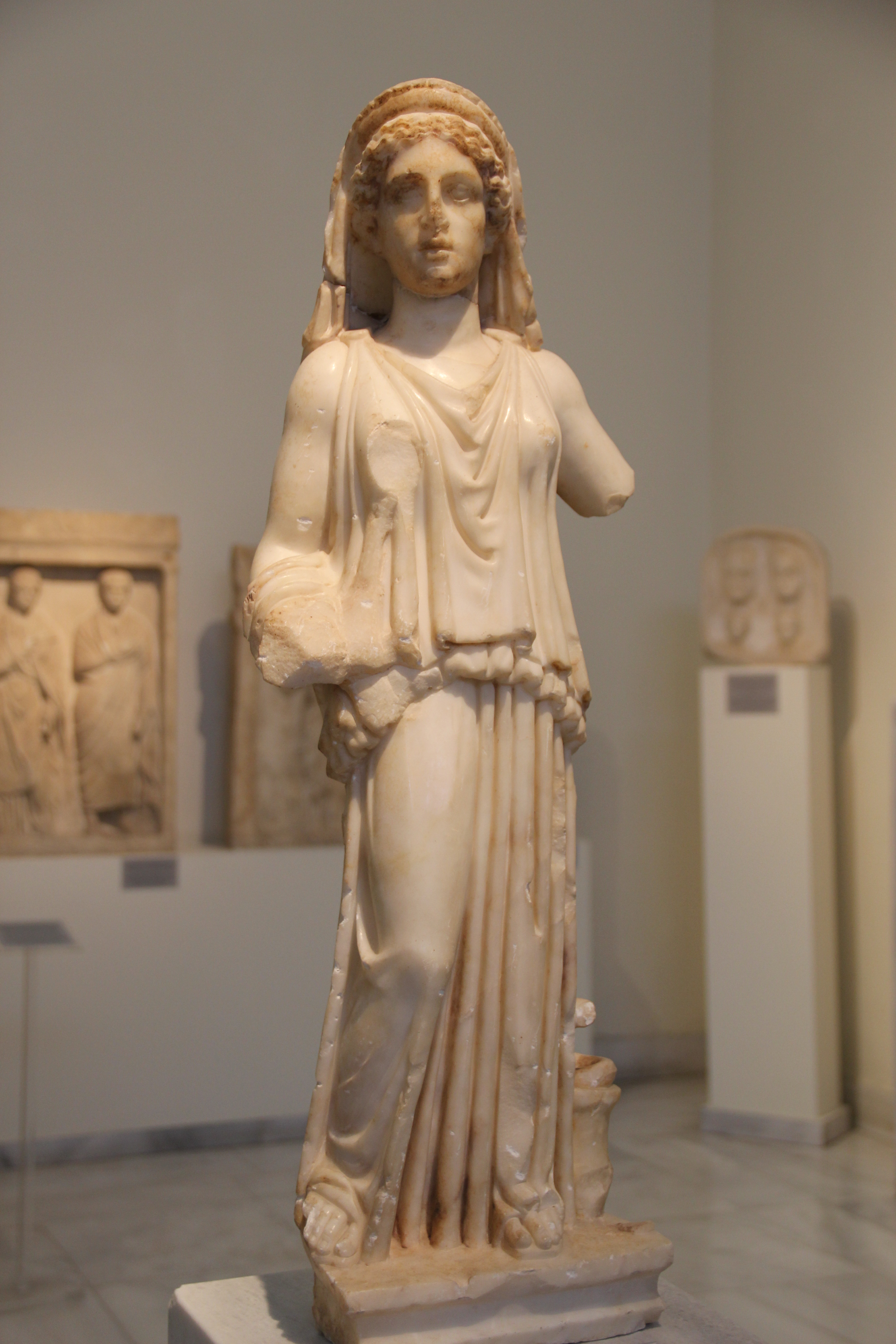
Ancient Greece marble statue

Local variations of cults made different requirements. The most common rule was that goddesses had priestesses, and male gods had male priests. The virgin goddess Artemis was, for example, served by young virgins, while Hera, goddess of marriage, was served by adult married women. However, it was far from uncommon for there to be a staff of several different "temple servants" in each temple which included both men and women in different positions.

== Appointment ==
There were mainly three methods in which a priestess was appointed: allotment, appointment, or inheritance. Regardless of method, a religious official was normally chosen from among the elite class and aristocracy, as such an office had great prestige.

A priestess was counted among the public officials of the city, and her office was considered an honor and commemorated with pride by her family. Some sanctuaries honored their priestesses with inscriptions and portrait statues. For this reason, the education necessary for performing was often customarily given to all daughters of aristocratic families with the right position and status for being appointed to the office.

== Duties ==
The priestess was the custodian of the keys to the temple. She was the caretaker of the cult statue of the temple. She was the chief of lesser office holders in the temple, such as temporary female temple servants who often served for shorter periods of time, and had a say in who should be appointed to such posts. She officiated at sacred rituals, presided over and led rituals of worship, and performed ritual sacrifice.

While the duties of a priest or priestess differed between the local temples in which they served, there were some common similarities. During the public festival of the divinity, the priestess participated in the sacred procession to the temple, often carrying sacred objects. Upon arrival to the temple, she performed a public prayer on behalf of the city. Before the prayer, she performed a libation (drink sacrifice). She continued with a dedication or consecration, usually divided into the chernips or lustration (chernips), the throwing of barley groats (oulochytai), and then performed the prayer itself. After this, the sacrifice was performed with the slaughter of the sacrificial animal. The slaughter was sometimes followed by the search of omen. After this, the flesh was divided between the god (by being burned at the altar) and the humans, which was followed by a holy public feast in which the people present dined in the presence of the divinity.

She also officiated at private rituals, when a private person wished to be initiated in a mystery, or wished to have a personal prayer said for them, for which she would receive a fee.

The priestess learned and preserved the sacred knowledge through generations, and was consulted as a religious authority. She could for example be asked to found a new temple in a colony of the mother city, or give advice to a political power holder.

== Privileges ==
The privileges of the priestess differed widely between temples. Normally, the priestess was given an income from the city, since the office was regarded as a public office. In addition to this, she was also awarded for each ritual and festival she participated in, and given fees for special rituals she performed for private people. She was normally given a share in the sacrificial animals, such as the skins and furs of the dead animals.

The office of priestess of a temple had great prestige and high status, and priestesses were given many official privileges by their cities, such as reserved seats at public theaters and similar honors otherwise mainly given to male political and military figures. It was common for the priestesses to be commemorated in public portrait statues at the temple in which they served, as well as elaborate public state funerals.

== Career ==
In many cults, a priestess served only for a limited time. This was especially true of virgin priestesses. Priestesses required to be unmarried virgins during their tenure served for a limited time prior to marriage, often only a year, after which their successor was appointed. The priestesses serving the cult of Athena Alea of Tegea, Artemis of Aigeira, Artemis Triklaria of Patrai, Artemis of Ephesus and Poseidon of Kalaureia all served only for a short time between that of reaching adulthood until their wedding.

In contrast some priestesses served for life. This was especially true in the case when the office was inherited and the requirement was the priestess was to be a mature married women. The priestess of Heraion of Argos, for example, who was a mature married woman, served for life.

Somewhat different were the number of Greek oracles, who had a similar position and are categorized as priestesses.

== Impact ==
The Hiereiai priestesses were an influence in how the priestess office were conducted in Roman religion, which was heavily influenced by Greek traditions. The Greek priestesses continued to hold office until the Roman Empire became Christian, although the name of the office holders are only fragmentary preserved.

All priestess offices were banned when religious freedom was abolished during the persecution of pagans in the late Roman Empire, specifically by the Emperor's Edict in 393. This was in line with the Christian principle that women were not to hold priestly office. It appears that some early Christian women assumed that such offices were to become open to them in the worship of the holy virgin Mary, but as Mary was a human and not a deity the Christian church condemned such a thing as heresy.

== Types ==
- Athenai and High Priestess of Athena Polias
- Basilinna
- Gerarai
- Peleiades
- High Priestess of Demeter
- Pythia

== See also ==
- Eritha
