= Basileia =

Basileia (Ancient Greek: βασιλεία and βασίλεια (feminine form of basileus), meaning royal status or power, sovereignty, dominion, reign, kingdom, palace, queen, or princess) may refer to:

- An alternate name for Theia, the daughter of Uranus, according to Diodorus Siculus, Bibliotheca historica 3.57.2-8
- The royal palace, or citadel, of Atlantis, as described by Plato in his dialogue Critias
- The royal quarter of Ptolemaic Alexandria
- The Kingdom of God (basileia tou theou), or Kingdom of Heaven, in Christian theology
- Basileia, usually translated as "Sovereignty," Zeus's maid in the play The Birds by Aristophanes
- Basileia Romaion, the Greek name for the Eastern Roman Empire, translated as Roman Empire or 'Empire of the Romans'
- The Sutsilvan spelling of Basel, a city in northwestern Switzerland

== See also ==
- Basilinna
