= Peleides =

Peleides may refer to:

- Peleides, Achilles son of Peleus in Greek history born around 1300 BC died around 1275 BC
- Morpho peleides (Peleides blue morpho), an iridescent tropical butterfly

== See also ==
- Peleiades
- Pleiades (disambiguation)
