= Priestess of Hera at Argos =

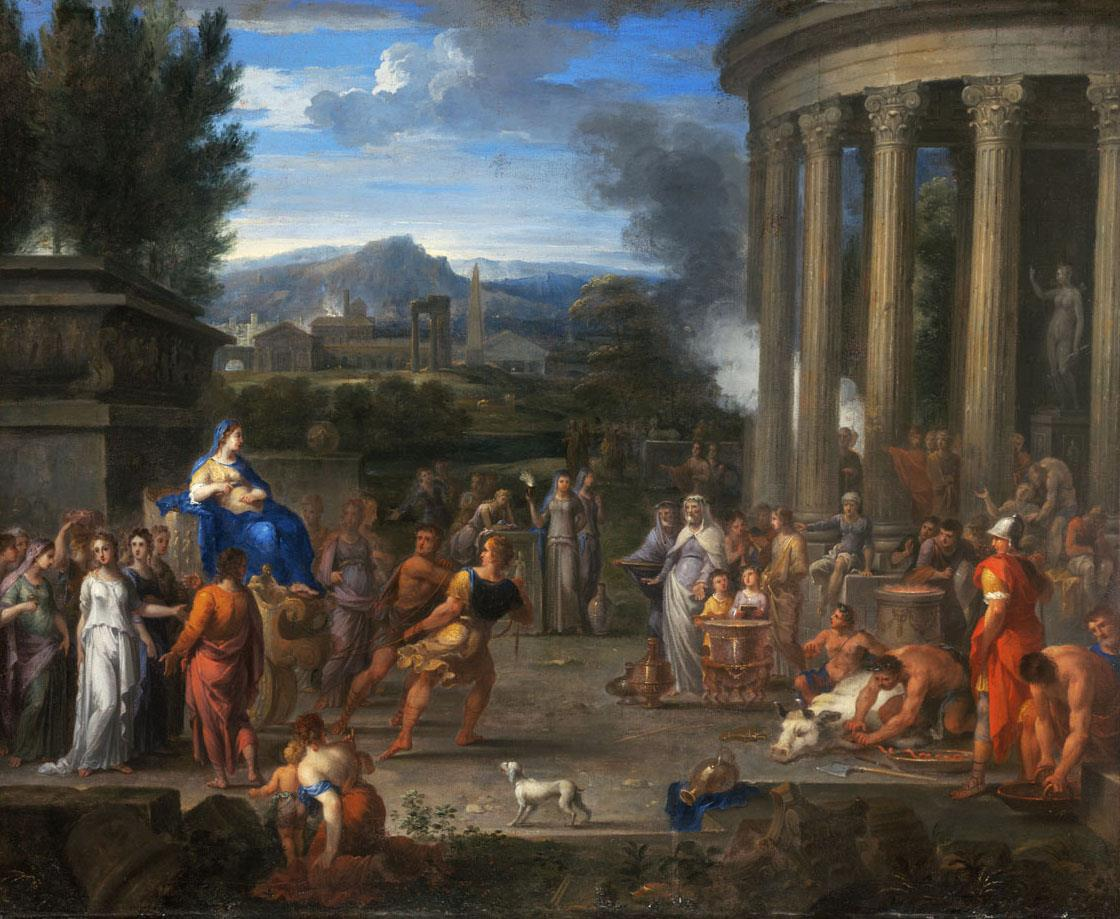
Cleobis and Biton, by Nicolas Loir: Cydippe of Argos, Kleobis and Biton.

The Priestess of Hera at Argos was the High Priestess of the Goddess Hera, the protective city deity of Ancient Argos, on the Heraion of Argos in Argos.

It was the highest religious office in Ancient Argos, and the person who held it enjoyed great prestige and played an official role. The Heraion of Argos was a Pan-Hellenic sanctuary, and her office was that of great status not only in Argos but in all Greece. A sign of her prestige was that the time period of the office of each Priestess was used as a time chronology in large parts of Greece.

Hellanicus of Lesbos composed a chronology of all priestesses of Hera at Argos, going back to about 1000 BC. There are several different legends about whom the first office holder was. The office likely predated the temple, as the cult was celebrated in the open long before the sanctuary was built.

The Priestess was likely selected from a family with inherited right to the office. She appears to have been a married woman, which would be logical to the cult of Hera as the goddess of marriage. Several priestesses served for a remarkably long time, so that it appears that the office was kept for life.

She supervised the temple and the cult of Hera, and was the chief of the lesser officials of the cult.

The most-known individual official of this position was Cydippe of Argos, the mother of Kleobis and Biton, and another was Chrysis (priestess).

The office could not have survived the ban of all non-Christian priesthoods during the persecution of pagans in the late Roman Empire.

== See also ==
- High Priestess of Demeter
- High Priestess of Athena Polias
- Sacerdos Cereris
