= Gerarai =

Priestesses of Dionysus in ancient Greek religion

Gerarai (Ancient Greek: Γεραραί), also known by the latinized form Gerarae, were priestesses (Hiereiai) of Dionysus in ancient Greek religion.

They presided over sacrifices and participated in the festivals of Theoinia and Iobaccheia that took place during the month of Anthesteria, among other duties. Fourteen in all, they were either sworn in by the Athenian basilinna or her husband, the archon basileus. One of their primary duties during the Anthesteria was to assist in performing the sacred marriage rites of the queen to Dionysus, and thus held to secrecy. According to a folk etymology, they were called Gerarai, from the Greek word γηράσκω, gerasko, "I grow old". Older women were chosen for the role.

== See also ==
- Anthesteria (Choes)
- Bacchae
- Dionysia
- Maenad
