= Anthesteria =

Festival in honor of Dionysus

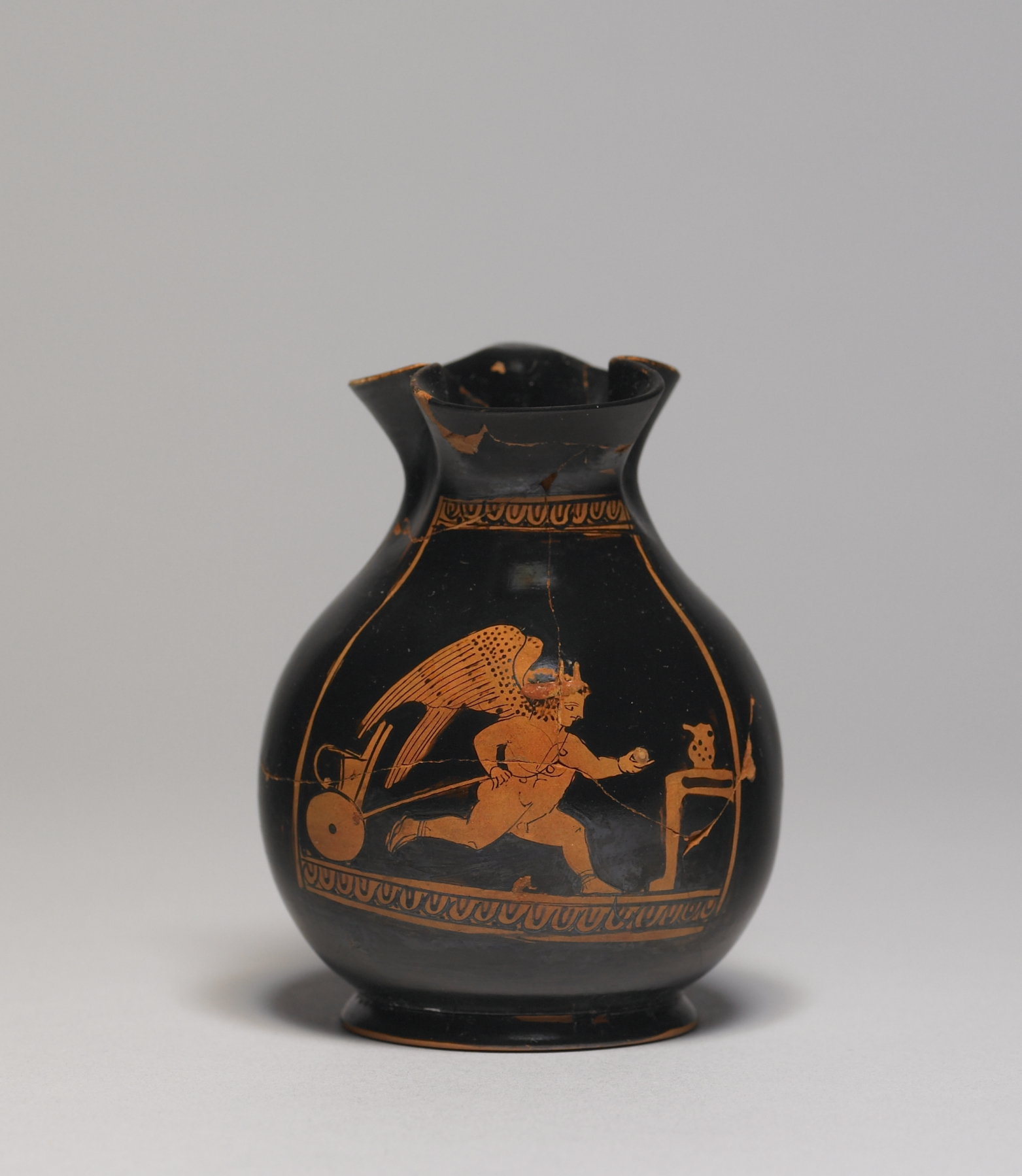
Small terracotta wine vessels such as this one (c. 410 BC) were given as gifts during the Anthesteria. They often depict children at play or mimicking adults, here a chubby Eros pulling a toy cart. (Walters Art Museum)

The Anthesteria (/ˌænθɪˈstɪəriə/; Ancient Greek: Ἀνθεστήρια [antʰestέːri.a]) was one of the four Athenian festivals in honor of Dionysus. It was held each year from the 11th to the 13th of the month of Anthesterion, (Note: The month Anthesterion is named after the festival and not vice versa.) around the time of the January or February full moon. (Note: Thucydides noted that "the more ancient Dionysia were celebrated on the twelfth day of the month of Anthesterion in the temple of Dionysus Limnaios ("Dionysus in the Marshes").) The three days of the feast were called Pithoigia, Choës, and Chytroi.

The festival celebrated the beginning of spring, particularly the maturing of the wine stored at the previous vintage, whose pithoi (storage-jars) were now ceremoniously opened. During the feast, social order was interrupted or inverted, the slaves being allowed to participate, uniting the household in ancient fashion. The Anthesteria also had aspects of a festival of the dead: either the Keres (Κῆρες) or the Carians (Κᾶρες) (Note: That is, either the souls of the dead or the shades of the aboriginal inhabitants of Attica.) were entertained, freely roaming the city until they were expelled after the festival. However, the word Keres is often used to refer spirits of evil instead of the dead. A Greek proverb, employed of those who pestered for continued favors, ran "Out of doors, Keres! It is no longer Anthesteria".

== Name ==
The name is usually connected with anthes- (ἀνθεσ-), the combining form of anthos (ἄνθος, 'flower'). This is cognate with Sanskrit andhas ('soma plant') and may have referred to the 'bloom' of the grape vine. The Cambridge ritualist A. W. Verrall, however, glossed the name as a Feast of Revocation (ἀναθέσσασθαι, anathessasthai, to "pray up") in reference to the aspects of the festival where the dead were considered to walk among the living. Harrison also regarded the Anthesteria as primarily concerned with placating ancestral spirits.

== Origins ==
Athenians of the Classical age were aware that the festival was of great antiquity. Its ritual marriage of a queen to Dionysus recalls myths concerning Theseus and Ariadne, but this is no longer considered a dependable sign that the festival had been celebrated in the Minoan period. Since the festival was celebrated by Athens and all the Ionian cities, however, it is assumed that it must have preceded the Ionian migration of the late eleventh or early tenth century BC. This still makes it the oldest datable part of the Eleusinian Mysteries.

== Days ==
=== Pithoigia ===
The first day was Pithoigia (Πιθοίγια, lit. 'The Jar-Opening'). (Note: Harrison argued that the jars in question should also or instead be understood as the urns used for burial, making the Pithoigia a feast of opening the graves, initiating the arrival of the dead among the living.) The jars of wine (pithoi) from the previous year were opened, libations offered to Dionysus, and the entire household (including slaves) joining in the festivities. Spring flowers were used to decorate the rooms of the house, the home's drinking vessels, and any children over three years of age.

The days on which the Pithoigia and Choës were celebrated were both regarded as apophrades (ἀποφράδες, 'unlucky'; Latin equivalent nefasti) and miarai (μιαραί, 'defiled'), necessitating expiatory libations. On them, the souls of the dead came up from the underworld and walked abroad. People chewed leaves of hawthorn or buckthorn and besmeared their doors with tar to protect themselves from evil. Nonetheless, the festive character of the ceremonies predominated.

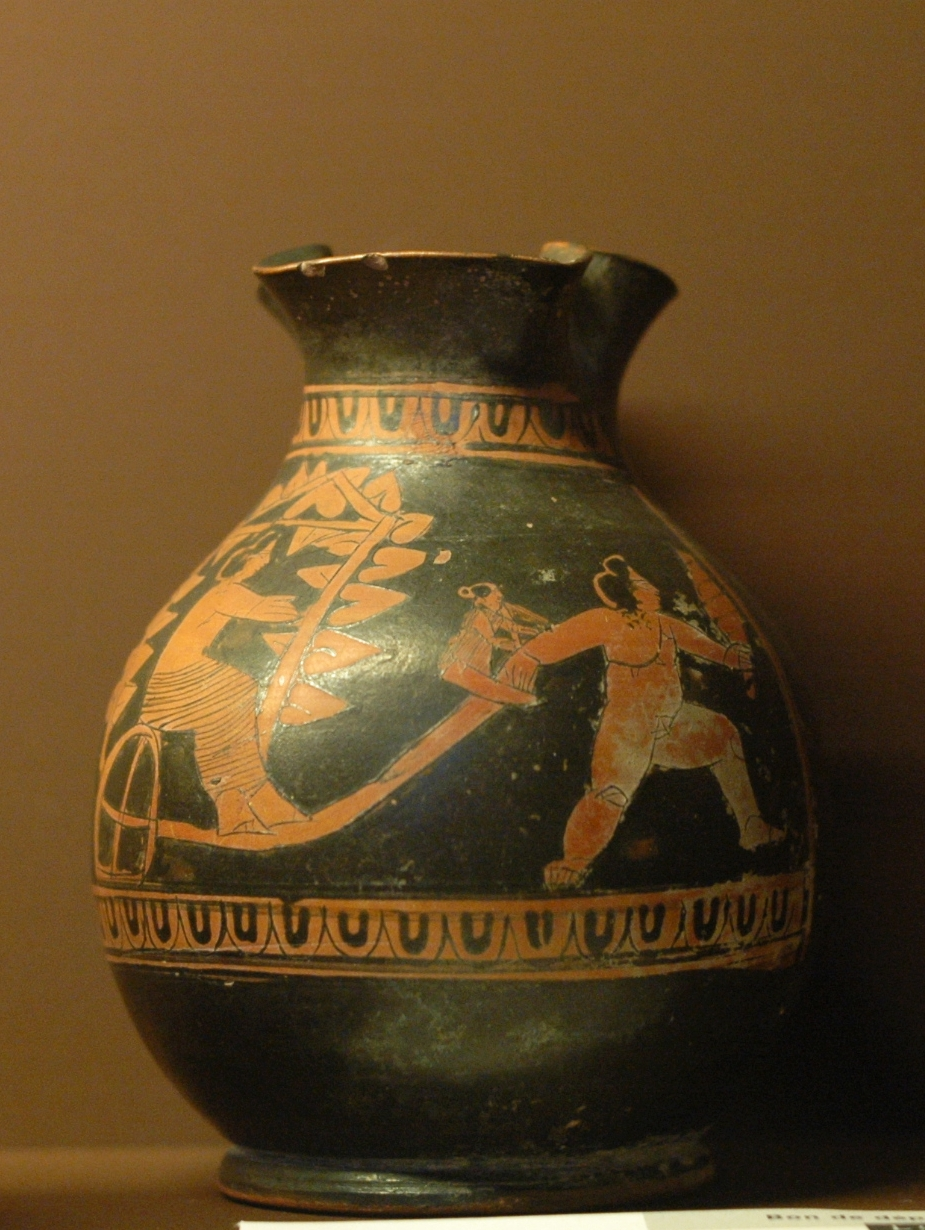
Attic red-figure oinochoe depicting a young boy pulling another boy's chariot, perhaps a parody of the Anthesteria's hierogamy (430–390 BC)

=== Choes ===
The second day was Choës (Χοαί, Khoaí, lit. 'The Pouring'). Merrymaking continued: people dressed themselves gaily, some in the figures of Dionysus's entourage, and paid a round of visits to their acquaintances. Drinking clubs held contests to see who could drain their cups the most rapidly. These competitions were done in silence and slaves were also allowed to participate. Others poured libations on the tombs of deceased relatives. The day also marked a state occasion: a peculiarly solemn and secret ceremony in the sanctuary of Dionysus 'in the marshes' (ἐν λίμναις, en límnais), which was closed throughout the rest of the year. Despite the name, there were no actual marshes in the immediate surroundings of Athens (Note: Walter Burkert points out that this implies the name must have been imported with the cult.) and the sanctuary was located in the Bouleuterion in the Athenian Agora. Athens' ritual queen, the basilinna, underwent a ceremony of marriage to the god. She was assisted by the gerarai, 14 Athenian matrons chosen by her husband the archon basileus, who were sworn to secrecy. Burkert regarded the ceremony as a recreation of the yielding of Ariadne to Dionysus by Theseus during their escape from Crete.

=== Chytroi ===
The third day was Chytroi (Χύτροι, Khýtroi, lit. 'The Pots'), (Note: Harrison argued that the name should be understood as a reference to grave holes, not pots. Rohde and Nilsson took it to mean water pots, connecting it with the Hydrophoria honoring the spirits of the dead thought to have perished in the Great Flood of Deucalion.) a festival of the dead. Fruit or cooked pulse was offered to Hermes in his capacity as Hermes Chthonios, an underworld figure, and to the souls of the dead, who were then bidden to depart. None of the Olympians were included and no one tasted the pottage, which was food of the dead. Celebration continued and games were held. Although no performances were allowed at the theater, a sort of rehearsal took place, at which the players for the ensuing dramatic festival were selected.

== See also ==
- Athenian festivals
- Attic Calendar
- Dionysia and Bacchanalia
- Ganachakra
- Lenaia
- Rosalia and Feast of the Lemures
- Halloween
  - All Souls' Night, Day of the Dead, and carnival
