= Cydippe of Argos =

Mythological Greek character, mother of Cleobi and Bitone

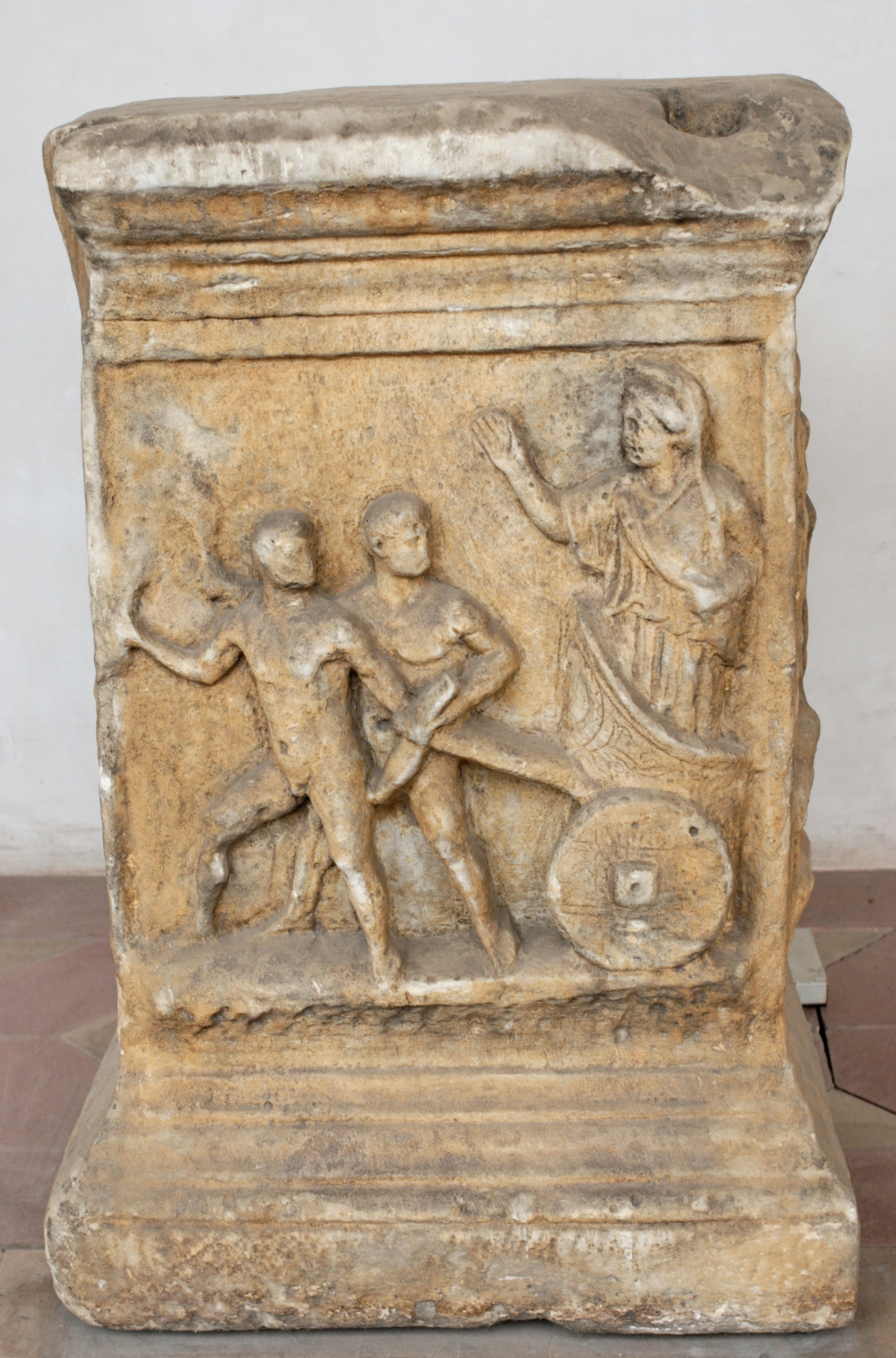
Altar depicting the myth of Kleobis and Biton.

In Greek mythology, Cydippe (Ancient Greek: Κυδίππη, Kudíppē), was the mother of Cleobis and Biton and a priestess of Hera at Argos.

== Mythology ==
Cydippe was on her way to a festival in the goddess' honor. The oxen which were to pull her cart were overdue and her sons, Biton and Cleobis pulled the cart the entire way (45 stadia; 8 km). Cydippe was impressed with their devotion to her and asked Hera to give her children the best gift a god could give a person. Hera had the two brothers drop dead instantaneously as the best thing she could give them was for them to die at their moment of highest devotion. This is Herodotus's account (Histories 1.31) of the story and it comes couched as advice from Solon the Athenian to Croesus as to who the most blessed people in history are. The most often used quotation from this episode is (roughly translated) "call no man blessed until he is dead."

Herodotus, the original source for this story, does not state the name of the mother of Cleobis and Biton. The first mention of their mother's actual name can be found in Plutarch, Frag. 133 (= Stobaeus 4.52.43) "ἔτι δὲ Κλέοβις καὶ Βίτων, Κυδίππης τῆς μητρὸς αὐτῶν ..." Plutarch (first century CE) is the earliest source for her name that is now available to us. Surely much intervening literature regarding Cydippe the priestess of Hera has been lost, since Plutarch was writing about 500 years after Herodotus first told the story.
