= Hydrophoria =

Ancient Greek festival

On the third day of the Anthesteria festival in Athens, during late February and early March, in honor of Dionysus, the Hydrophoria (Ancient Greek: Υδροφόρια) took place, commemorating those who perished in the Flood of Deucalion.

The Athenians would throw wheat flour kneaded with honey to the chthonic deities into a chasm located in the sanctuary of Earth Olympia, which was situated in the temple of Olympian Zeus. This temple was constructed by Deucalion when he arrived in Athens.

At the end of the ceremony, it was believed that the souls returned to the Underworld, and thus the people would shout: Thyraze Kares, ouket' Anthesteria ("Out, Kares, the Anthesteria is over").

This particular ritual is reminiscent of the Christian Psychosavvata (Saturdays of the Souls).

== Hydrophoria in Aegina ==
Hydrophoria was also the name of the contests held in Aegina during the Delphinia festival in honor of Apollo. These contests commemorated the offering of drinking water to the Argonauts during their expedition to Iolcus.

== Bibliography ==
- Nilsson, Martin P. (1906). Griechische Feste von religiöser Bedeutung mit Ausschluss der attischen. Leipzig: B.G. Teubner. p. 172. (in German)
- William Smith; William Wayte; G. E. Marindin, eds. (1890). "HYDRIAPHORÍA". A Dictionary of Greek and Roman Antiquities.
