= Pleiades (disambiguation) =

The Pleiades are an open cluster of stars in the constellation Taurus.

Pleiades may also refer to:

- Pleiades (Greek mythology), seven sisters of Greek mythology

== Geography ==
- The Pleiades (volcano group), a group of volcanoes in Antarctica
- Les Pléiades, a mountain in Switzerland

== Music ==
- Pléïades, a composition by Iannis Xenakis
- "Pleiades", a 1989 song by King's X from Gretchen Goes to Nebraska

== Other uses ==
- Alexandrian Pleiad, Greek poets and tragedians in the 3rd century BC
- Pleiades (arcade game), a 1981 arcade game produced by Tehkan and Centuri
- Pleiades (magazine), an American magazine of fiction, poetry, essays, and book reviews
- Pleiades (satellite), an Earth-observation satellite programme operated by CNES
- Pleiades (supercomputer), a supercomputer at NASA's Ames Research Center
- Pleiades (wine), a wine produced by Sean Thackrey
- The Pleiades, characters in the novel series Overlord by Kugane Maruyama

== See also ==
- Bibliothèque de la Pléiade or Pléiade editions, the standard editions of major works of (mostly) French literature published by Éditions Gallimard
- La Pléiade, a group of 16th-century French Renaissance poets
- Pleiades in folklore and literature, interpretations and traditional meanings of the star cluster among various human cultures
- Peleiades
