= Sacerdos Cereris =

Roman priestess

A statue base honoring the priestess of Ceres, Céres Flavia Ammia

Sacerdos Cereris, sacerdos Cerealis or sacerdos Cereris publica was the title of the Priestess of the goddess Ceres in Ancient Rome. It was one of two Roman state cults to include female priests (the other being the Vestals).

The worship of Demeter and Persephone were introduced in Rome as the worship of Ceres and Proserpina, as well as the Roman versions of Thesmophoria (sacrum anniversarium) and Eleusinian Mysteries (initia Ceres), where Roman wives and daughters sacrificed a sow and enacted the drama between the goddess and her daughter.

This cult was supervised by the priestesses of Ceres. As the cult was originally Greek, the priestesses, at least initially, were selected among Greek women from Naples and Elea. They had a high position in Roman society, where they were the only priestesses aside from the Vestals who were active within a publicly funded state cult.

== See also ==
- High Priestess of Demeter
- Priestess of Hera at Argos
