= Chrysis (priestess) =

Argive priestess of Hera

Chrysis (or Chryseis, Ancient Greek: Χρυσίς or Χρυσηίς) was the priestess of Hera at the ancient Greek sanctuary of Hera at Argos at the time of the Peloponesian War. She is known for having inadvertently caused a fire that led to the destruction of the temple.

Thucydides mentions in book 2 of his history of the Peloponesian War that at the outbreak of the war, in 431 BC, Chrysis was in the 48th year of her tenure as head priestess of Argos. The burning of the temple, in the summer of 423 BC, is mentioned in book 4 of the same work. According to Thucydides, Chrysis placed a light near a curtain and then fell asleep. She survived the fire and fled from Argos to the nearby city of Phlius. According to Pausanias, her flight led her to Tegea, where she found asylum at the sanctuary of Athena Alea. Pausanias also mentions that in his time a statue of Chrysis still stood at Argos.

The catastrophe of Argos was later mentioned by the Christian theologians Clemens of Alexandria and Arnobius (who, unlike Thucydides, assumed that Chrysis herself had perished in the fire), as perceived examples of the powerlessness of heathen gods. Her case is the topic of an entry in Pierre Bayle's Dictionnaire historique et critique of 1695.
