= Priestess of Demeter and Kore =

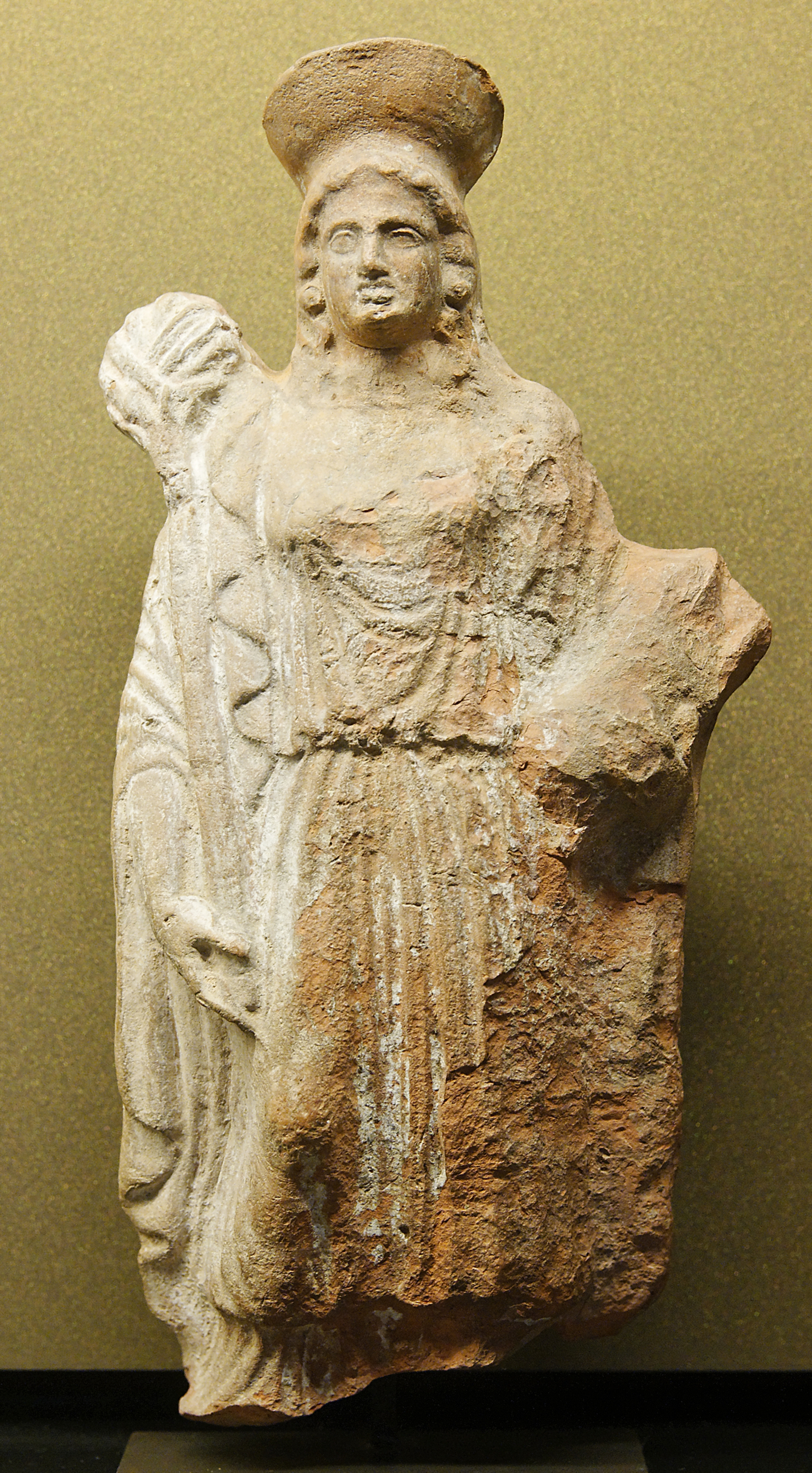
Female figure carrying a torch and piglet to celebrate rites of Demeter and Persephone (from Attica, 140–130 BCE)

The Priestess of Demeter and Kore, sometimes referred to as the High Priestess of Demeter, was the High Priestess of the Goddesses Demeter and Persephone (Kore) in the Telesterion in Eleusis in Ancient Athens. It was one of the highest religious offices in Ancient Athens, and its holder enjoyed great prestige. It was likely the oldest priesthood in Athens, and also the most lucrative priesthood in all of Attica.

The Temple of Demeter of Eleusis had a number of both male and female clerical offices: hierophantos ("the revealer of the sacred objects"); dadouchos (torch bearer); keryx (holy herald); exagetes; pyrphoros (fire bearer); phaidyntes (purificator), altar priests, and girls and boys who were initiated to the hearth. The Priestess of Demeter and Kore and the Priestess of Plouton were the two hierophantides-priestesses. The Priestess of Demeter and Kore was the foremost priestess were the priestess of the highest ranked and have been referred to as the High Priestess. She was unique among the Priestesses of Athens since she served two deities at the same time: Demeter as well as Persephone (Kore).

The Priestess of Demeter and Kore was a married mother, but it is not clear exactly how she was appointed; it is unknown if she inherited or was appointed to the office. It is known that many of the bearers of the office were married women of the Philledai-family, but it is unknown if the office was inherited within the clan or if they had a monopoly to it.

The Priestess officiated during the famous Eleusinian Mysteries. She also officiated during lesser festivals, such as the Thesmophoria and the Haloa.

The office could not have survived the ban of all non-Christian priesthoods during the persecution of pagans in the late Roman Empire.

== See also ==
- High Priestess of Athena Polias
- Priestess of Hera at Argos
- Sacerdos Cereris
