= High Priestess of Athena Polias =

Religious title in Ancient Greece

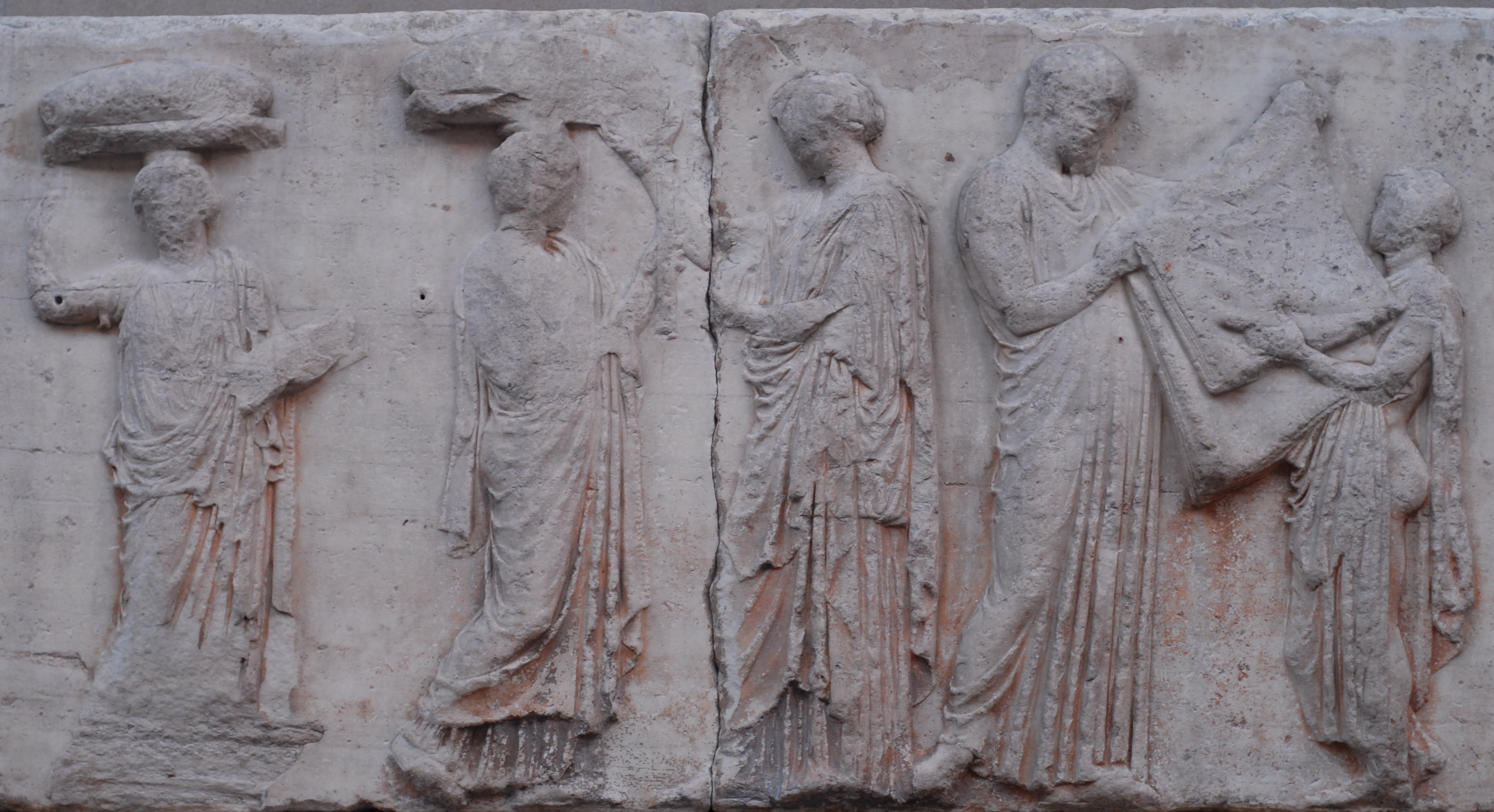
Relief believed to depict a procession honoring Athena; the woman in the middle has sometimes been identified as the High Priestess of Athena Polias.

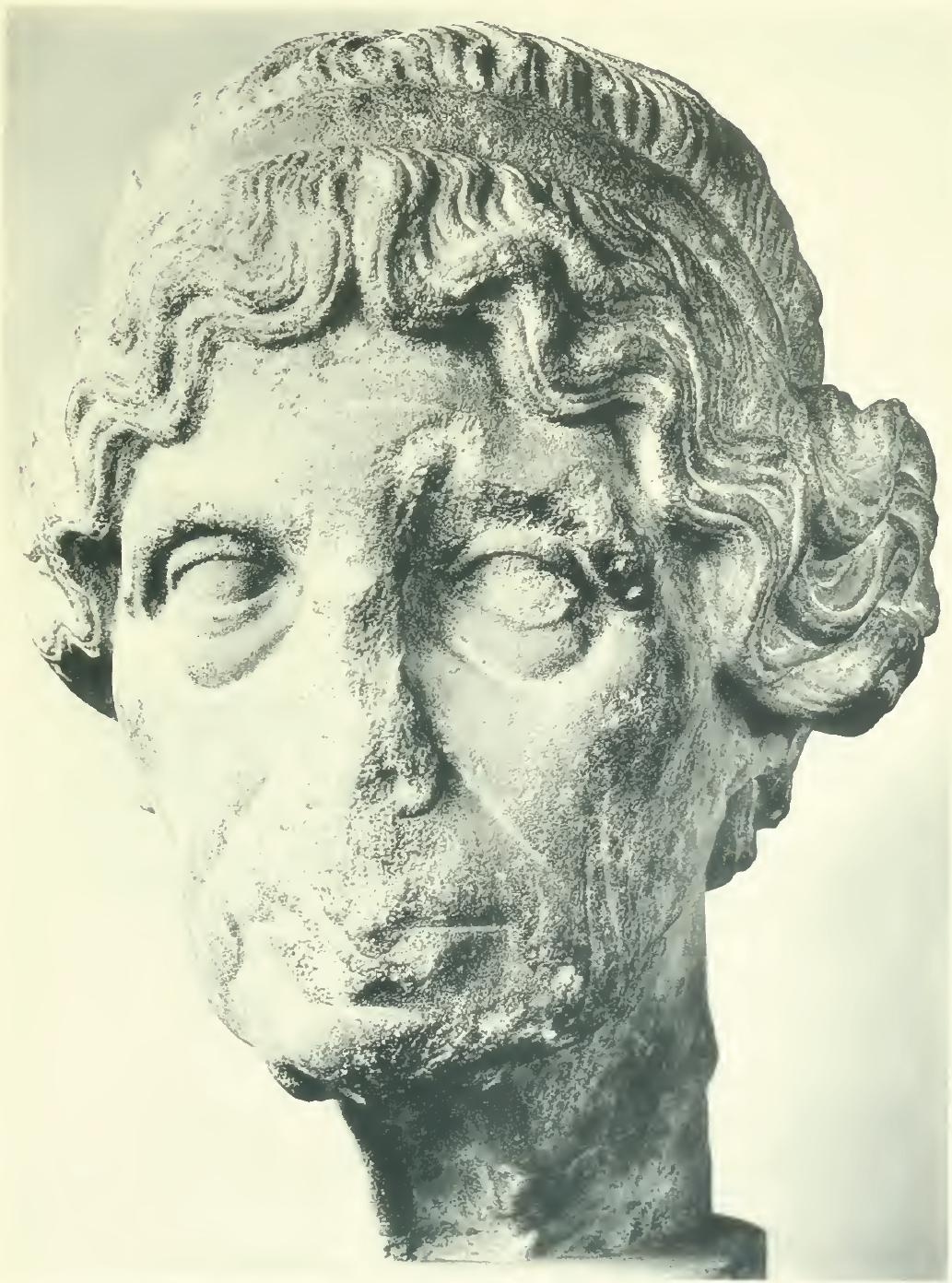
Marble portrait head of an old woman, sometimes identified as Lysimache, priestess of Athena.

The High Priestess of Athena Polias was the office of the senior Priestess serving Athena in the temple of Parthenon on the Acropolis in Athens. It was the highest religious office in Ancient Athens.

The priesthood was a hereditary position open only to married women, with a lifetime appointment. The officeholder enjoyed great prestige, and played a role in affairs of state which was otherwise closed to women in Ancient Athens; there are several recorded instances of a High Priestess influencing a historically-significant event or recommending a specific person for public office. It was not a celibate office, and the office holder was normally a married woman and mother, who hold the office for life.

The High Priestess supervised the city cult of Athena, enshrined in the Parthenon, and was the chief of the lesser officials such as the plyntrides, arrephoroi and kanephoroi. Athena Polias ("Athena of the City") was one of the three divine patrons of the Acropolis of Athens, the other two being served by the High Priest of Poseidon-Erechtheus and the Priestess of Athena Nike.

Each holder of the office had a public statue and inscriptions made celebrating her time in office. However most of these statues are destroyed. Twenty five names of the office holders between the 5th century BC and the 3rd century AD are still preserved.

Many holders of the office are noted to have participated in important events in the history of Athens, but most of them are only mentioned in isolated incidents. In one incident that attracted attention, the Priestess banned the King of Sparta to step foot in the temple, since she claimed it would be against the rules. Before the famous Battle against the Persians in 480 BC; the Priestess in office warned the city to evacuate by stating that the holy snake of the Goddess had left the temple; the city authorities then evacuated the city, which proved to be fortunate since the battle resulted in Athens being pillaged by the Persians and the temple being destroyed.

The best-attested High Priestess was Lysimache I, who held the office for 64 years during the early 4th century BCE and who may have inspired the character of Lysistrata in Aristophanes's play.

If the office was still active during the late fourth century, it would have been suppressed during the Theodosian persecutions, along with all other non-Christian forms of religious expression.

== See also ==
- High Priestess of Demeter
- Priestess of Hera at Argos
