= Peleiades =

Greek mythological figures

Peleiades (Greek: Πελειάδες, "doves") were the sacred women of Zeus and the Mother Goddess, Dione, at the Oracle at Dodona. Pindar made a reference to the Pleiades as the "peleiades" a flock of doves, but the connection seems witty and poetical, rather than mythic. The chariot of Aphrodite was drawn by a flock of doves, however. A mythic element of a black dove that initiated the oracle at Dodona, which Herodotus was told in the 5th century BC may be an attempt to account for a folk etymology applied to the archaic name of the sacred women that no longer made sense (an aitiological myth). Perhaps the pel- element in their name was originally connected with "black" or "muddy" root elements in names like Peleus or Pelops and peliganes (Epirotian, Macedonian senators), Attic polios, Doric peleios grey, old, PIE *pel-, "gray". Peleiades are often confused with the nymphs Pleiades.

== See also ==
- Ancient Epirotes
- Pythia
- Hiereiai

== Sources ==
- Athenaeus (translated by Charles Duke Yonge). The Deipnosophists, Or, Banquet of the Learned of Athenaeus. Henry G. Bohn, 1867 (Original from Harvard University).
- Hutchinson, G. O. Greek Lyric Poetry: A Commentary on Selected Larger Pieces. Oxford University Press, 2001. ISBN 0-19-924017-5
