= Archon basileus =

Greek title

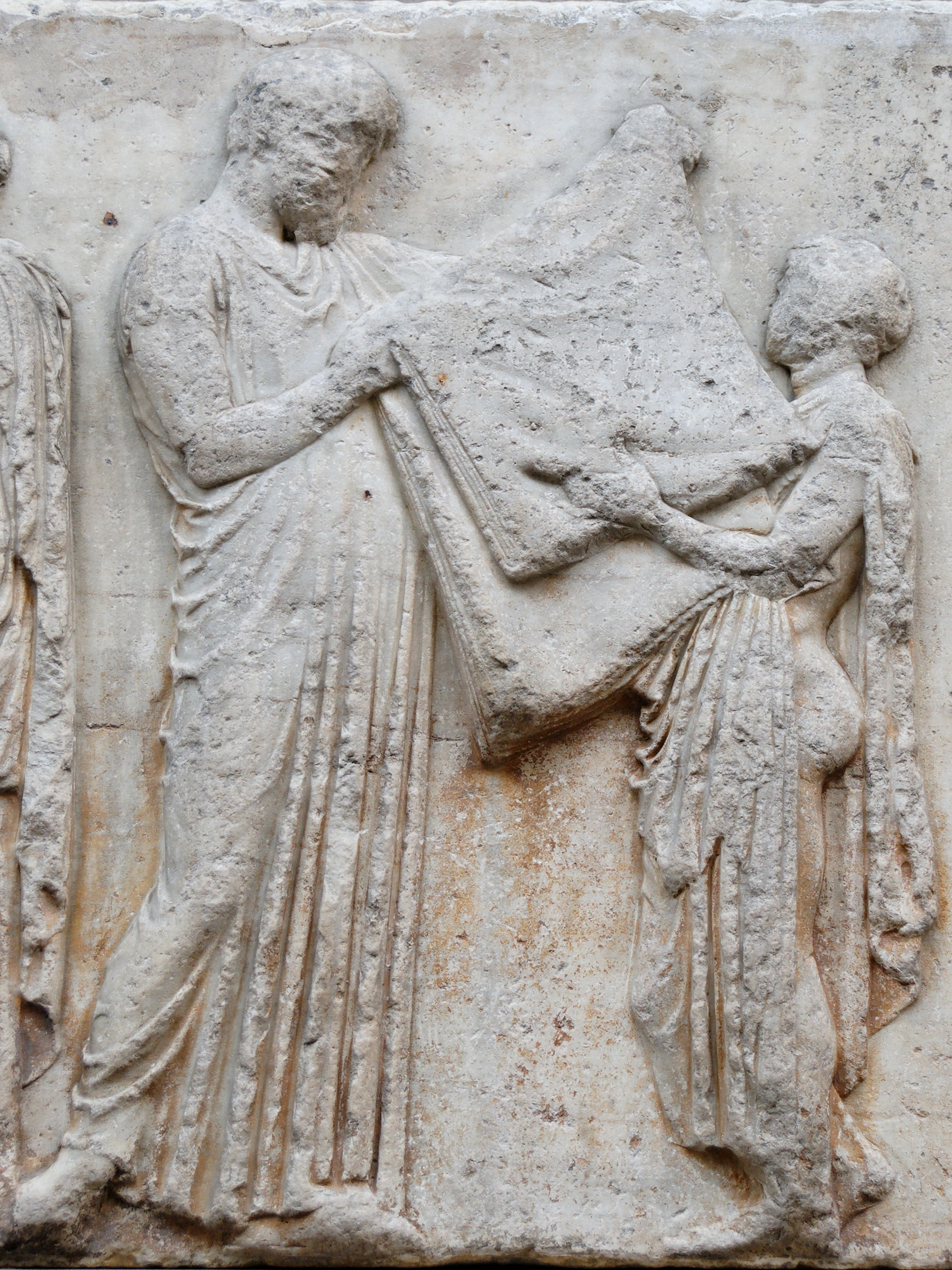
East Parthenon Frieze likely depicting the Archon Basileus receiving a folded cloth (possibly the sacred peplos of Athena) from a boy. c. 447-433 BC

Archon basileus (Ancient Greek: ἄρχων βασιλεύς, árchōn basileús) was a Greek title, meaning "king magistrate"; the term is derived from the words archon "magistrate" and basileus "king" or "sovereign".

== Background ==
Most modern scholars claim that in Classical Athens, the archon basileus was the last remnant of monarchy. Although much of his powers, they say, had been filtered away to other institutions such as the Areopagus and later the Boule and Ecclesia, he still nominally held a high position in Athenian society, alongside the archon eponymos and the polemarchos. The archon basileus was charged with overseeing the organisation of religious rites and with presiding over trials for homicide. The archon basileus was the high priest of the city-state.

There is a tradition that originally the archon basileus was elected from the Athenian aristocracy every ten years. After 683 BC, the office was only held for a year, and after Solon's reforms, he was elected from the wealthiest Athenians, the Pentakosiomedimnoi (Πεντακοσιομέδιμνοι), "500-bushel men", rather than the Eupatridae (the aristocratic families). After 487 BC, the archonships were assigned by lot.

It is believed the archon basileus's wife, the basilinna, had to marry and have intercourse with the god Dionysos during a festival at the Boukoleion in Athens, to ensure the city's safety. It is uncertain how this was enacted. However, this was an important role for a woman who, according to Plutarch and Solon, would otherwise be confined to the house and be of little importance.

== See also ==
- Eponymous archon
- Polemarch
- Rex Sacrorum
