= Basilinna =

Ancient Greek priestress, wife of the attic Archon basileus

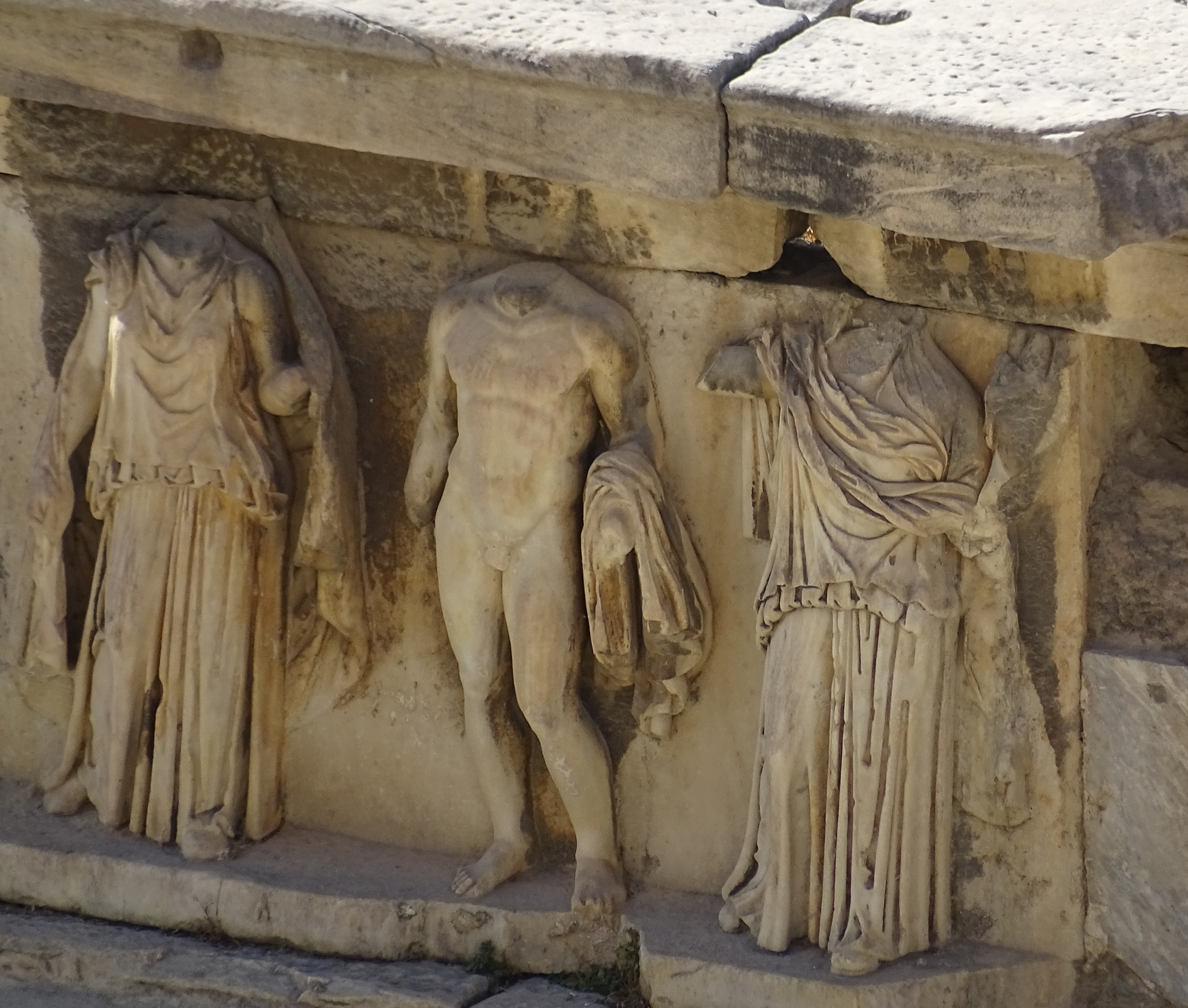
The Basilinna with Dionysus and Tyche in the Bema of Phaidros, 3rd century, Athens Greece

The basilinna (Ancient Greek: βασίλιννα) or basilissa (Ancient Greek: βασίλισσα), both titles meaning "queen", was a ceremonial position in the religion of ancient Athens, held by the wife of the archon basileus. The role dated to the time when Athens was ruled by kings, and their wives acted as priestesses (Hiereiai). The duties of the basilinna are described in the pseudo-Demosthenic speech Against Neaira, which is the main source of evidence about the position.

The laws which set out the qualifications for a basilinna were inscribed on a stele which stood in the sanctuary of Dionysus at Limnai. She was expected to be of Athenian birth and not previously married, though Noel Robertson argues that these requirements may have been ignored as inconvenient.

The most important duty of the basilinna appears to have been taking part in a sacred ritual marriage to the god Dionysus as part of the Anthesteria. This ceremony seems to have taken place at the Boukoleion, near the Prytaneion. Most scholars consider that this would have happened on the second day of the festival ("Choes"). However, Robertson suggests that it in fact happened on the first day of the festival ("Pithoigia"). Ludwig Deubner has proposed a full reconstruction of the ceremony, in which Dionysus was taken in a procession to the sanctuary at Limnai and married to the basilinna; both the basilinna and Dionysus were then taken in a wedding procession to the Boukoleion, where the marriage was consummated, with the archon basileus playing the part of Dionysus.

The basilinna was also responsible for administering an oath to the gerarai, women priests apparently appointed by the archon basileus. This took place on the second day of the Anthesteria, and Robertson argues that it must have taken place after the wedding.

== Works cited ==
- Dillon, Matthew (2002). Women and Girls in Classical Greek Religion. New York: Routledge. ISBN 0415202728.
- Macurdy, Grace H. (1928). "Basilinna and Basilissa: the Alleged Title of the "Queen-Archon" in Athens". The American Journal of Philology. 49 (3). doi:10.2307/290093. JSTOR 290093.
- Robertson, Noel (1993). "Athens' Festival of the New Wine". Harvard Studies in Classical Philology. 95. doi:10.2307/311383. JSTOR 311383.
