= Heraion of Argos =

Ancient Greek temple

- Ἡραῖον Ἄργους (Greek)
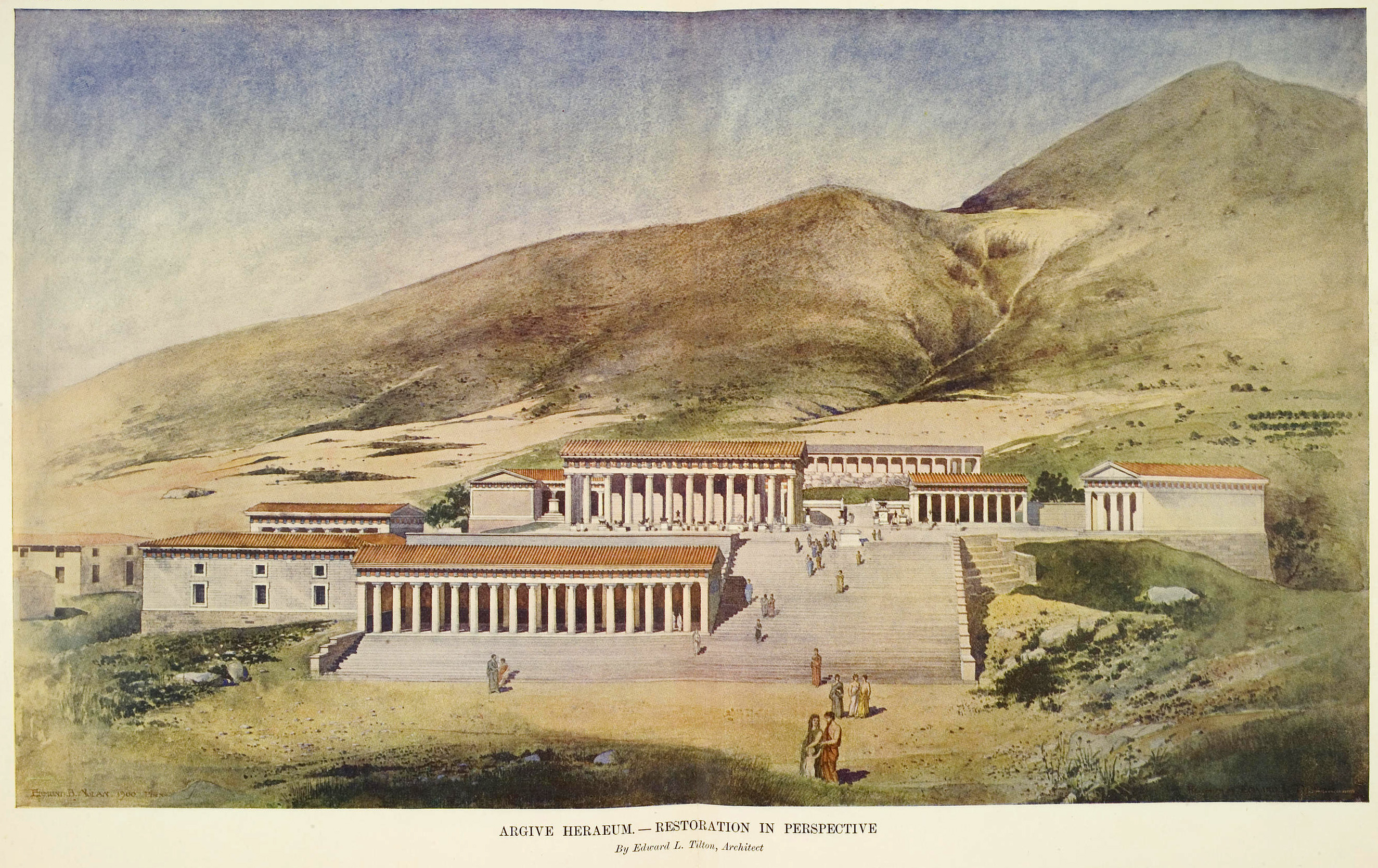
- Heraion of Argos, reconstruction on a 1902 painting

- Location within Greece
- 37°41′31″N 22°46′29″E
- Type: Sanctuary
- Location: Argolis, Greece
- Region: Argolis

Site notes
- Management: 4th Ephorate of Prehistoric and Classical Antiquities
- Public access: Yes
- Website: Hellenic Ministry of Culture and Tourism

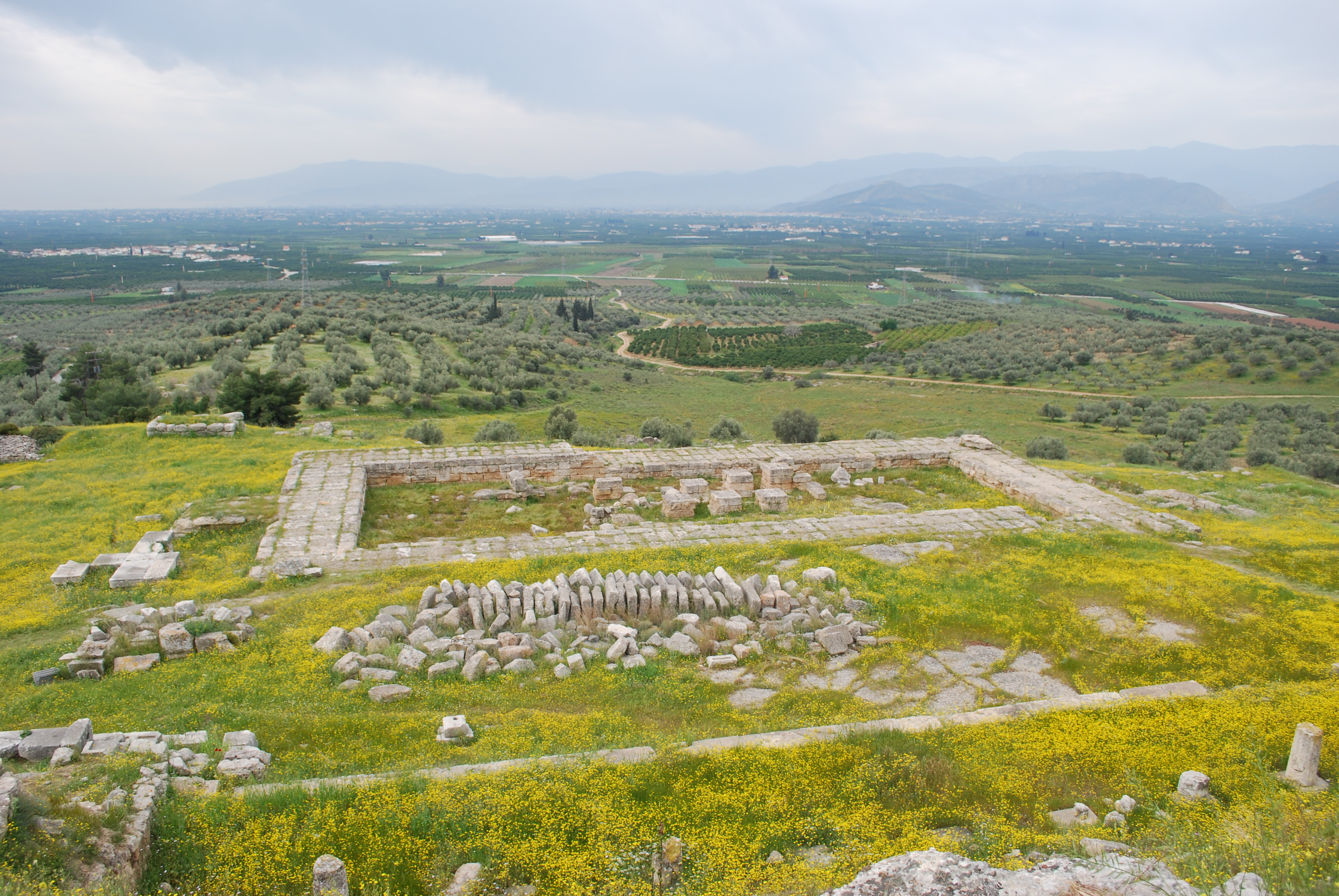
View from the Heraion of Argos into the Inachos plain.

The Heraion of Argos (Greek: Ἡραῖον Ἄργους) is an ancient sanctuary in the Argolid, Greece, dedicated to Hera, whose epithet "Argive Hera" (Ἥρη Ἀργείη Here Argeie) appears in Homer's works. Hera herself claims to be the protector of Argos in Iliad IV, 50–52): "The three towns I love best are Argos, Sparta and Mycenae of the broad streets". The memory was preserved at Argos of an archaic, aniconic pillar representation of the Great Goddess. The site, which might mark the introduction of the cult of Hera in mainland Greece, lies northeast of Argos between the sites of Mycenae and Midea, two important Mycenaean cities. The traveller Pausanias, visiting the site in the 2nd century CE, referred to the area as Prosymna (Προσύμνη).

== Location ==
Located within the fertile Argive Plain in the Northeastern part of the Peloponnesian peninsula, the Heraion at Argos stands on the lower hills leading up to Mount Euboea. Around five miles from the city of Argos, three miles from Mycenae, and six miles from Tiryns, the Heraion remained accessible to inhabitants of the plain through a variety of walking trails and roads that brought surrounding enclaves, like Mycenae and Argos, together for worship and sacred games. The chosen area where the Heraion stands today is not completely flat, and the Argives constructed a massive retaining wall and terrace for a better space at the time of construction. The river Eleutherion runs close to the sacred site, providing water for cleansing rituals and sacrifices. Also nearby the Heraion are tombs from the plain's predecessors, the Mycenaeans; the establishment of the Heraion nearby this already sacred area served as a way for Argos to legitimize their growing state by linking it to Mycenaean heroic success and prestige.

== History ==
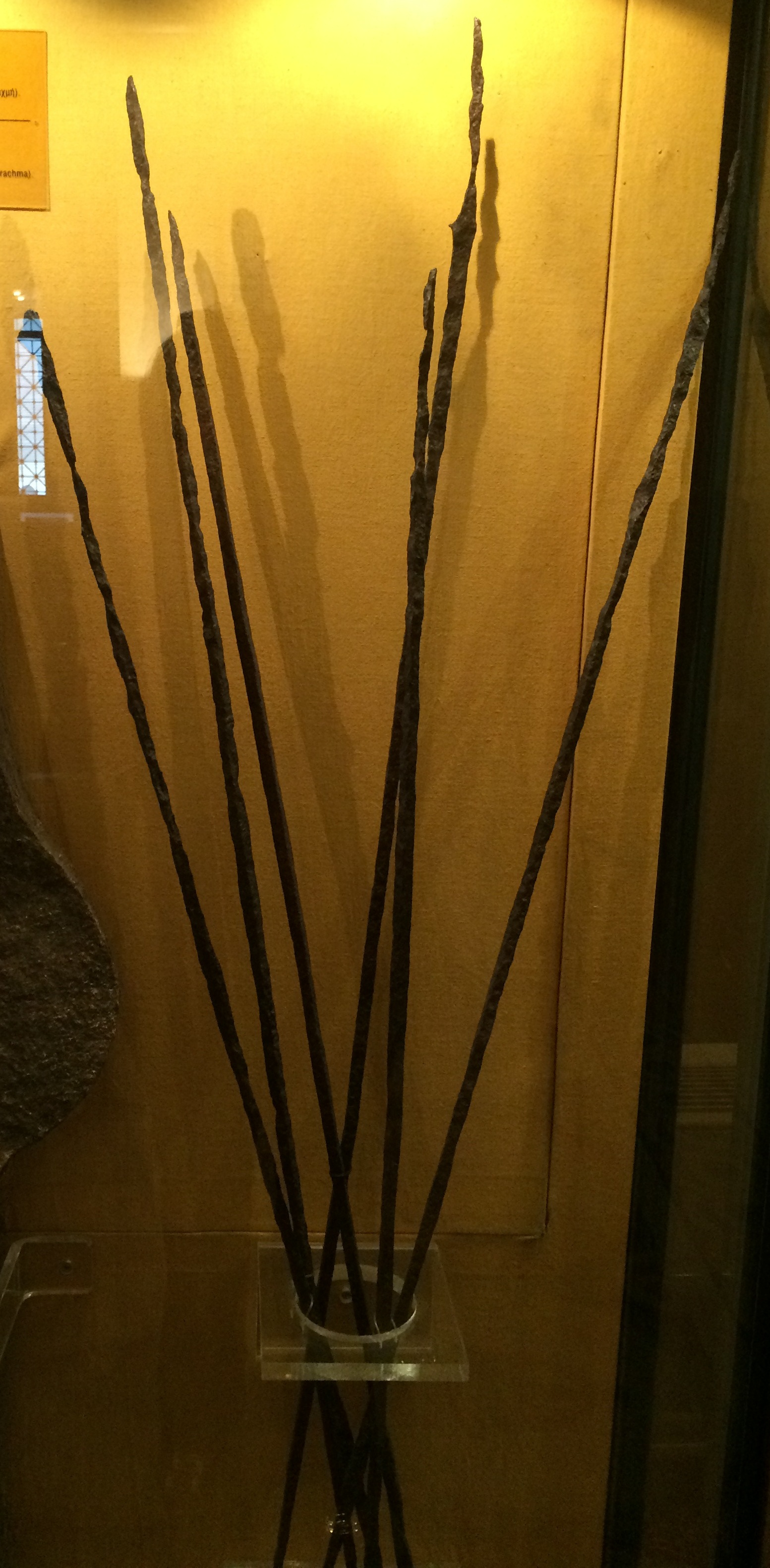
Iron oboloi in the form of spits uncovered at Heraion, now displayed at the Numismatic Museum of Athens.

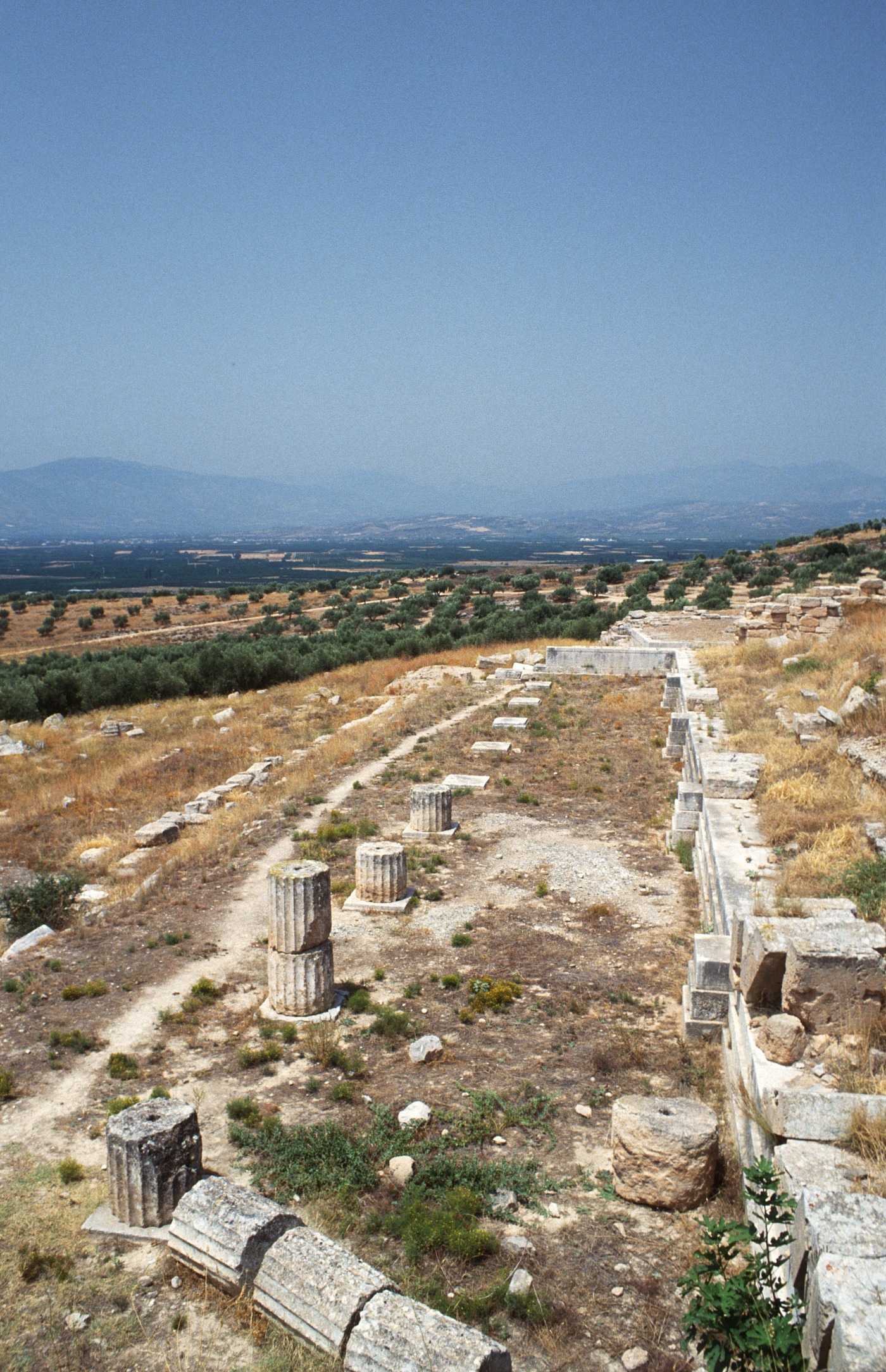
Remains of a stoa

=== Early use of the site ===
Before Argos built the earliest structures of the Heraion and held influence over the area, groups were using the land in the Neolithic period into the Late Helladic period. P. Alin found evidence in the form of Protogeometric pottery pieces to support that groups had settled near the Old Temple Terrace and the Second Temple, and he also found a tholos and plot of Mycenaean chamber tombs nearby. There is not enough evidence to confirm whether the site was continually used from the time of the Bronze Age to the Dark Age.

=== Development of the Heraion ===
At the end of the Dark Age, the Argive Plain underwent dramatic shifts and changes as populations grew and city states began to emerge. Among these emerging powers in the plain was Argos, previously a small group of towns in the Dark Age. As Argos grew in both population and wealth, it had the resources to take on projects that would serve and promote its growing community. The building of this large sacred space, the Heraion at Argos, reflected a new shared identity for the people within this area of the developing plain. Use of the sanctuary extended beyond Argos from the Heraion's establishment in the 8th century BCE, and the sanctuary functioned as a shared place of worship and meeting space for various communities in the Argive Plain until 460 BCE.

==== 8th and 7th century BCE ====
Measuring 55.80 m x 34.40 m, the rectangular Old Temple Terrace was the first structure built at the Argive Heraion. The Argives built the terrace in the late 8th or early 7th century by piling large stones of various shapes onto each other. These stones are found naturally around 50 m from the terrace surface, and on the southern side of this structure, and the Argives dispersed them intermittently with smaller blocks in between. Based on the remaining structure, it is clear that Argos was emulating the Mycenaean stonework style, Cyclopean masonry. Such a choice in design was purposeful; the people of developing Argos sought to forge links with the preceding Mycenaeans, who were especially revered and worshipped in this time period. As explained by E.L. Tilton, it is clear Argos built this part of the Heraion far after the Mycenaeans. First, Tilton points out that the terrace is too long and is not segmented in the way Mycenaeans typically built their walls and terraces. Additionally, the stones employed by the Argives in the construction of the Old Temple Terrace are bigger than those installed by Mycenaeans. From these observations done in 1903, Tilton concluded that Argos was consciously trying to recreate and imitate structures from the time of the Mycenaeans. The Old Temple Terrace at the Heraion stands above the central terrace, and the structure serves as a retaining wall; the hard surface constructed on the top of the wall acts could have acted a foundation for a large structure.

The Old Temple stands on the upper terrace of the Heraion nearby. With only the southern stylobate intact, archaeologists have not been able to date it with certainty, but the stylobate's style is reflective of structures dated to the 7th century. Strom and Billot suggest that the temple had columns, though Billot contends that the inside design and layout cannot be discovered due to lack of evidence. There is a paved section to the west and south of where the Old Temple Terrace and on the Old Temple. Due to their high visibility from afar, these spaces could have served to showcase impressive dedications from wealthy visitors of the Argive Heraion.

==== 6th century BCE ====
Coulton dated the long stoa of the Heraion to be from the late 7th to 6th century BCE in 1976. The long stoa, also called the North Stoa, measures 62.10 x 9.20 m. Additionally, Coulton dated a smaller stoa, the North-East Building, to be from around the middle of the 6th century BCE. The North-East Building, measuring 20.60 x 6.90 m, is to the east of the larger North Stoa. Billot suggests in his 1997 work that Argos also built the West Building, a gathering space, during this century. However, Miller's work in 1973 puts this building's construction in the last half of the 5th century or later, according to a hypothesized order of construction. The West Building still retains a main peristyle with two rows of columns to the east, south, and west. To the North of the building, there are three rooms with a shared hallway that connects other rooms from the west and main part of the building. There are cuttings for couch space, suggesting that these three rooms functioned as a space for dining and socializing.

==== 5th century BCE and beyond ====
The middle of the 5th century BCE yielded many changes for Argos and its territory. While the Heraion at Argos functioned primarily as a shared worship and meeting space for communities nearby in the Argive Plain, the Argive quest for expansion and power in the middle of this century altered the structure of the Heraion. Argos conquered the nearby states of Mycenae, Tiryns, and Midea in 460 BCE, and the considerable renovations and additions to the Argive Heraion site certainly reflect the changing sociopolitical state. Argos seemed to concentrate its changes to the lower terrace. First, Argos connected the two stoas built in the 6th century with a staircase leading up to the Old temple Terrace. There was also new construction to the east of the Heraion's site in the form of the establishment of the rectangular East Building. Argos also built another stoa on the southern side of the sanctuary, commonly referred to as the South Stoa.

In the History of the Peloponnesian War, Thucydides records that the Old Temple at the Heraion burned down in 423 BC (4.133). According to the account of Thucydides, a priestess, Chrysis, had inadvertently left a torch too close to some garlands which started the fire (4.133).

A new temple was built on a different terrace in between 420 BCE and 410 BCE. Amandry suggests that the construction of this new temple was not just solely because it was acting as a replacement; there is evidence that adding this temple, commonly called the classical temple, was planned even before the fire. To accommodate the growing Argive state during this time, expansion at the Argive Heraion was necessary, and further, these changes "fit well into a general pattern of post conquest revision, clarifying social status and rights in light of the new social order, integrating cult activity, and reinforcing Argos' dominant position on the plain" (Morgan 86).

If the temple was still in use by the 4th century AD, it would have been closed during the persecution of pagans in the late Roman Empire, when laws against non-Christian religions and their sanctuaries were enacted by the Christian emperors.

== Worship and religious practices ==
=== The goddess Hera ===
The Ancient Greeks worshipped Hera as the queen of the gods, amongst many other roles. At these sacred sites, like the Heraion at Argos, the Ancient Greeks usually emphasized specific certain qualities or roles that manifested themselves in the design of the sanctuary, rituals, and festivals held there. At the Argive Heraion, Hera was worshipped for a number of purposes that served the individual, family, and polis: "Hera appears as multifunctional goddess, whose Panhellenic status as a wife of Zeus and 'queen' of the gods stands behind her functions as protectress of childbirth, growing up, and marriage" (Baumbach 6). Hera appears to be a patron of the wellbeing of the family, and she also appears to have been worshipped in relation to the military and state, too, since these protected the household. Because of her encompassing role in everyday life, men and women both worshipped Hera.

=== Festivals and rituals ===
The Heraion accommodated a number of yearly festivals that included Argos and other nearby communities. Specifically, there were annual events to celebrate the Hieros Gamos of Hera and Zeus. According to Pausanias, the people of Argos believed that the spring of Kanathos by nearby Nauplion was sacred, and Hera bathed there to gain back her virginity before the Hieros Gamos. As a result, the Argives bathed her statue before the ceremonies surrounding this festival. Beyond this occasion, there is evidence that rituals for betrothed women occurred at the Argive Heraion. As a young woman left the status of a child and became a married woman, there were numerous practices at the site of the Heraion, like bathing in the water from the river Eleutherion, that would serve to get her ready for marriage.

Additionally, there is evidence for a procession up to the Argive Heraion from Argos. Called the Procession of the Hera Argeia, the march left the city of Argos and headed up the sacred way with groups of young women, cows, and armed young men in the parade. In the Histories, Herodotus tells of a specific event that occurred during one of these processions, the story of Kleobis and Biton (1.31). The sons of a priestess at the Heraion, Kleobis and Biton assist their mother in traversing up to the sanctuary by pulling her cart by hand. Upon a successful arrival, their mother prays to Hera for the highest blessing to be bestowed upon them. Kleobis and Biton go into the temple of Hera, fall asleep, and never awaken. Despite this description of the Procession of the Hera Argeia, it is still unclear when these processions began.

These festivals additionally enabled time for socialization, and they also allowed for competition between individual families and amongst different communities in the form of games. There is evidence that people of the Argive Plain held sacred games at the Argive Heraion, and archaeologists have found multiple bronze hydriai with inscriptions that indicate they were prizes.

=== Votives ===
Visits to the Argive Heraion often involved the dedication of votives to Hera, and since votives were traditionally left in place after dedication, these offerings provided a substantial amount of evidence for archaeologists studying the site. Worshippers at the Heraion said a prayer before leaving things like figurines, seals, amulets, and jewelry in specific areas at the site. By studying these votives, archaeologists have been better able to learn about the daily concerns, values, and lives of those in the Argive Plain. Findings of images that have symbols for childcare and womanhood further confirm Hera's status at this sanctuary of a protector concerned with the family. There are many small figurines of children and women as well as amulets for protection that support this hypothesis. Further, there have also been terracotta votives that depict household activities like making food, clothing, and weaving. These also confirm Hera's association with preserving the home. Finally, warrior figurines and shields found at the Argive Heraion indicate Hera's status as a protector and patron of the state. Because family served as a foundation for the army and the army would in turn protects the interests of the home, Hera's role as a patron goddess encompassed society within the Argive Plain in a very multidimensional way.

== Excavations ==
General Gordon found the Argive Heraion in 1831. Excavations of the Second Temple Terrace occurred, led by Gordon in 1836 and by Bursian and Rangabé in 1854. Schliemann investigated the Old Temple Terrace twenty years later. More comprehensive excavations began at the end of the 19th century. In 1892, Waldstein carried out four campaigns that surveyed the entire sanctuary, its surviving buildings, and votives. Blegen turned away from the sanctuary and did work on the surrounding area of the Argive Heraion, finding evidence for cemeteries and occupation nearby the site. Caskey and Amandry carried out an excavation upon the discovery of a large collection of votives underneath the East Building. Research has also been done by Kalpaxis, Strom, Billot, Pfaff, Coulton, and Miller in the late 20th century.

== Sources ==
- Stecchini, Livio C., "The Standard of the Heraion" (Internet Archive)
- Livio C., (1946) 2023 The Origin of Money in Greece Harvard University Ph.D. Dissertation
- Pfaff, Christopher A., (1992) 2003. The Argive Heraion: The architecture of the classical temple of Hera
- Burkert, Walter, 1985. Greek Religion (Harvard University Press)
- Pausanias, Description of Greece, 2.15.4
