= Archaic Greek sculpture =

Period in ancient Greek sculpture

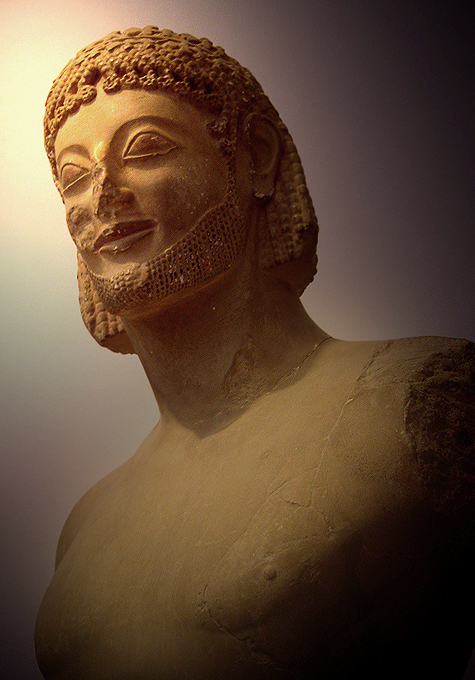
Detail of the Rampin Rider, c. 550 BC, Athens

Archaic Greek sculpture represents the first stage of the formation of the Greek sculptural tradition that became one of the most significant sculpture style in the entire history of the Western art period. The Archaic period of ancient Greece is poorly delimited with a great controversy among scholars. It is generally considered to begin between 700 and 650 BC and end between 500 and 480 BC, but some evidence has indicated a much earlier date for its beginning, 776 BC, the date of the first Olympiad. In this period, the foundations were laid for the emergence of large-scale autonomous sculpture and monumental sculpture serving the purpose of decoration on architectures. This evolution depended on the oriental and Egyptian influence, but soon acquired a peculiar and original character.

For a long time considered a mere prelude to Classical Greece, today the Archaic period is seen as a moment of intense intellectual, political and artistic activity, during which decisive achievements were made for the consolidation of Greek culture as a whole, and the sculpture of that time has great merits of its own, being a vehicle of specific and fundamental meanings for the society from which it was born through the development of unique forms.

From inauspicious beginnings, the sculpture of the Archaic period in its final stages attained high levels of aesthetic quality and formal complexity, signaling the passage from a practically aniconic culture to one in which visuality and figuration had become predominant, leaving a wide and seminal repertoire of representative types and modes, with particular emphasis on the human figure.

== Background ==
There is evidence of human presence in the region now known as Greece – including the continental portion and the islands – since the Paleolithic period, and in those early times, their artifacts amounted to simple stone and bone tools and weapons, and pottery. By the Bronze Age, there were already flourishing culture and considerable artists, so-called Aegean civilizations, composing of the Minoan, Cycladic and Mycenaean cultures. Statuettes in marble and alabaster survive from Cycladic art, some reaching large dimensions, mostly representing female deities with their arms folded across their chests, but there are also male specimens and others in various positions, pieces that became famous and eagerly collected for their highly stylized forms that remind us a little of modern sculpture. But precisely this great interest has caused serious problems for archaeological research. Only about 10% of the Cycladic sculptures known today have a proven provenance, and it is suspected that the rest may be recent forgeries, an uncertainty that complicates the description and study of the functions and meanings of this production. Some pieces show traces of pigment, indicating that in remote times the practice of painting the surface of sculptures had already been established, which would be continued throughout the history of sculpture in Ancient Greece.

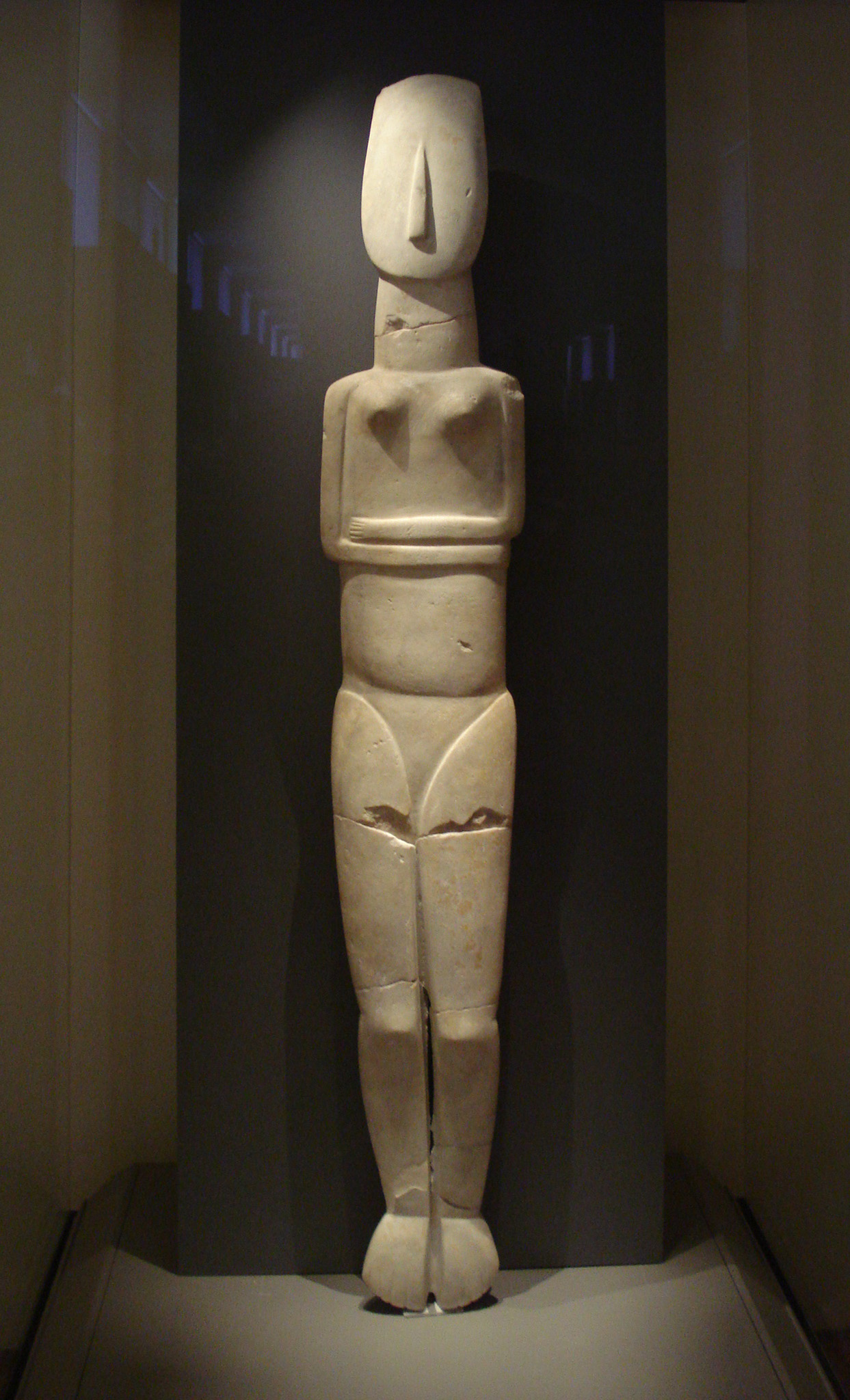
Cycladic idol, c. 2800–2300 BC

More or less contemporary to the Cycladic culture was the Minoan civilization, which flourished in Crete. What has come down to us of its sculpture are small statues, of which the Minoan snake goddess figurines, mostly in faience, found in the royal palace of Knossos, and the Palaikastro Kouros, in ivory, gold, stone and rock crystal, are famous, but it is possible that larger works in wood were also produced. The forms of the sculptures are much more elaborate and naturalistic than the Cycladic ones, but they have the same tendency toward frontality. In bronze sculpture, the Minoans showed great skill, having developed the lost-wax technique, and the period is particularly important because it consolidated a whole mythical process around the creative process, personified in the figures of the god Hephaestus, the masterful craftsman, and Daedalus, a legendary character who is credited with inventing the art of sculpture and magical powers of animating statues, and whose origin seems to have been oriental. The location of Daedalus at this time, however, seems to be a much later elaboration of the tradition, and it is more plausible that he was a sculptor from the 7th century BC, if indeed he existed at all. Recent studies have also pointed to the possibility that there may have been two Daedaluses: one a Minoan architect-builder, and the other a sculptor of the early Archaic or Orientalizing period, also sometimes called Dedalic in his honor.

Later, the Mycenaean culture dominated mainland Greece, which left imposing stone buildings and sophisticated gold grave goods, found especially in Tiryns, Argos, Troy and Mycenae. The palatial architecture remaining at these archaeological sites demonstrates an advanced degree of skill in the handling of stone, and its constructive scheme later gave rise to the Greek temple design. At Mycenae there are some of the earliest examples of Greek architectural sculpture, particularly well achieved in the Lion Gate, where two stylized lions, with clean, vigorous lines, stand symmetrically over the lintel of the palace entrance. The Lion Gate, however, because of its large dimensions, is an exception, as is a polychrome terracotta woman's head that may be part of one of the earliest examples of life-size cult statuary found from Greece. The other Mycenaean finds are generally tiny terracotta pieces. Given the scarcity of more complete evidence, it is difficult to make generalizations about sculptural practice among them, and despite their skill with metals, especially precious metals, praised by Homer in vivid descriptions, no bronze sculptural relics from this period survive.

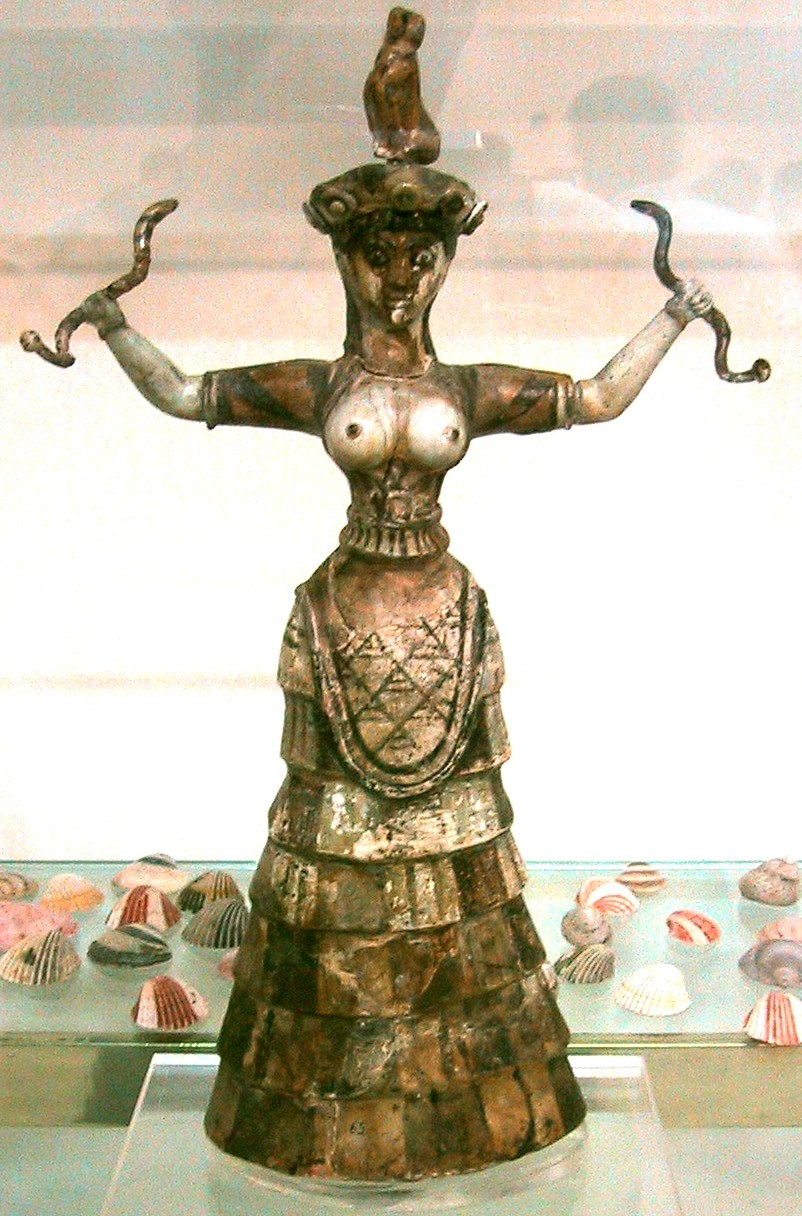
Goddess with Serpents, c. 1600 BC, Crete

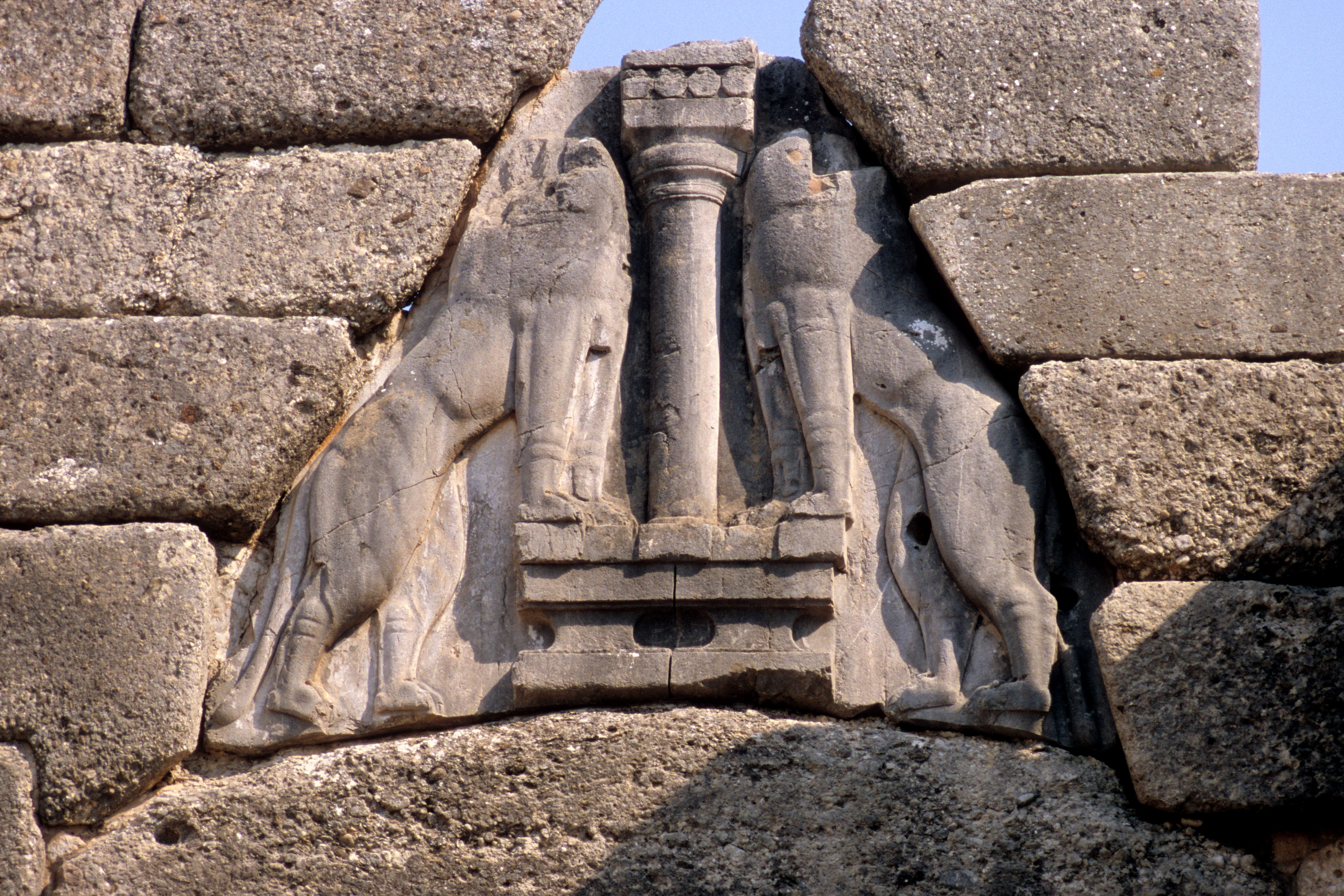
Lion Gate, c. 1300 BC, Mycenae

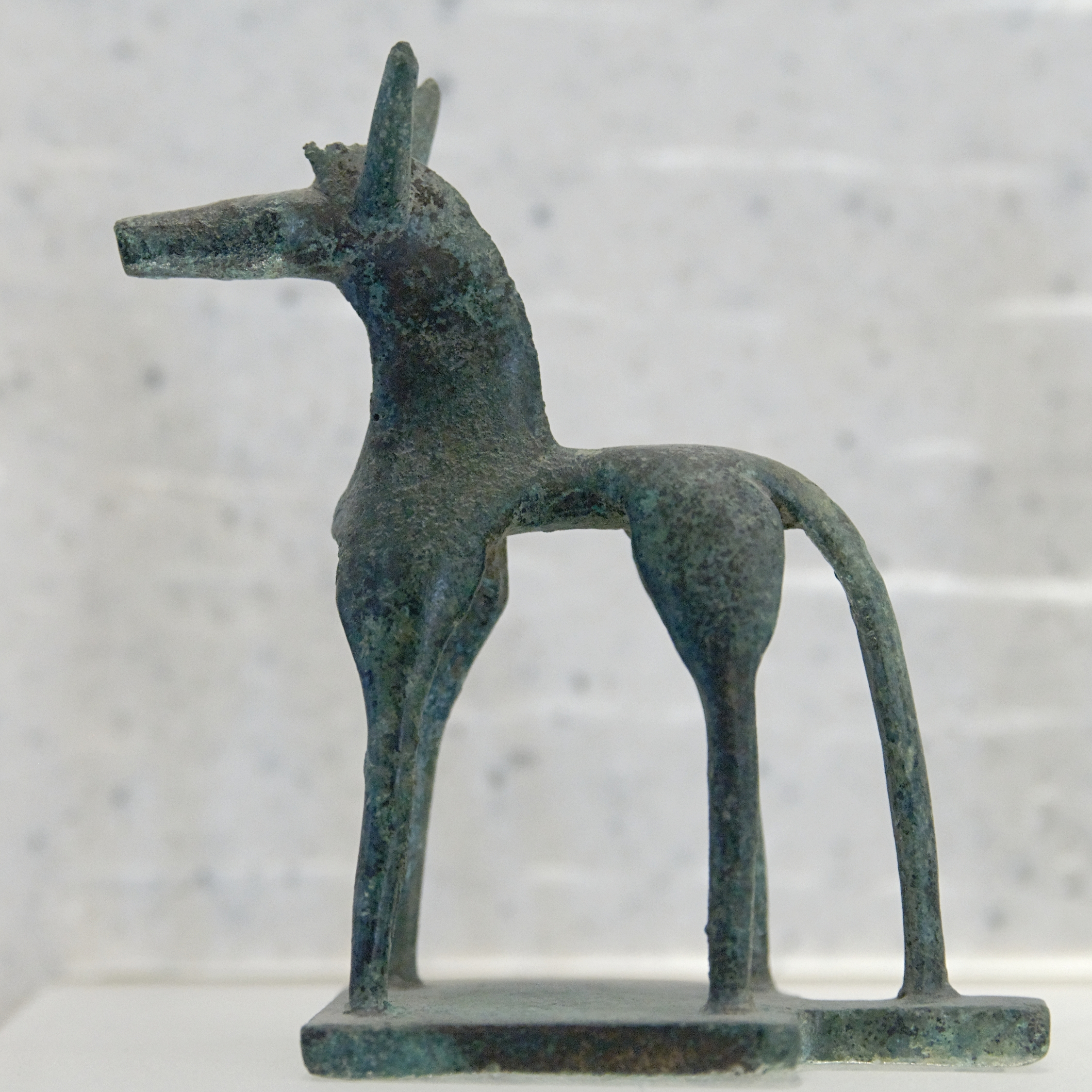
Horse from the Geometric period, c. 775–600 BC, Olympia

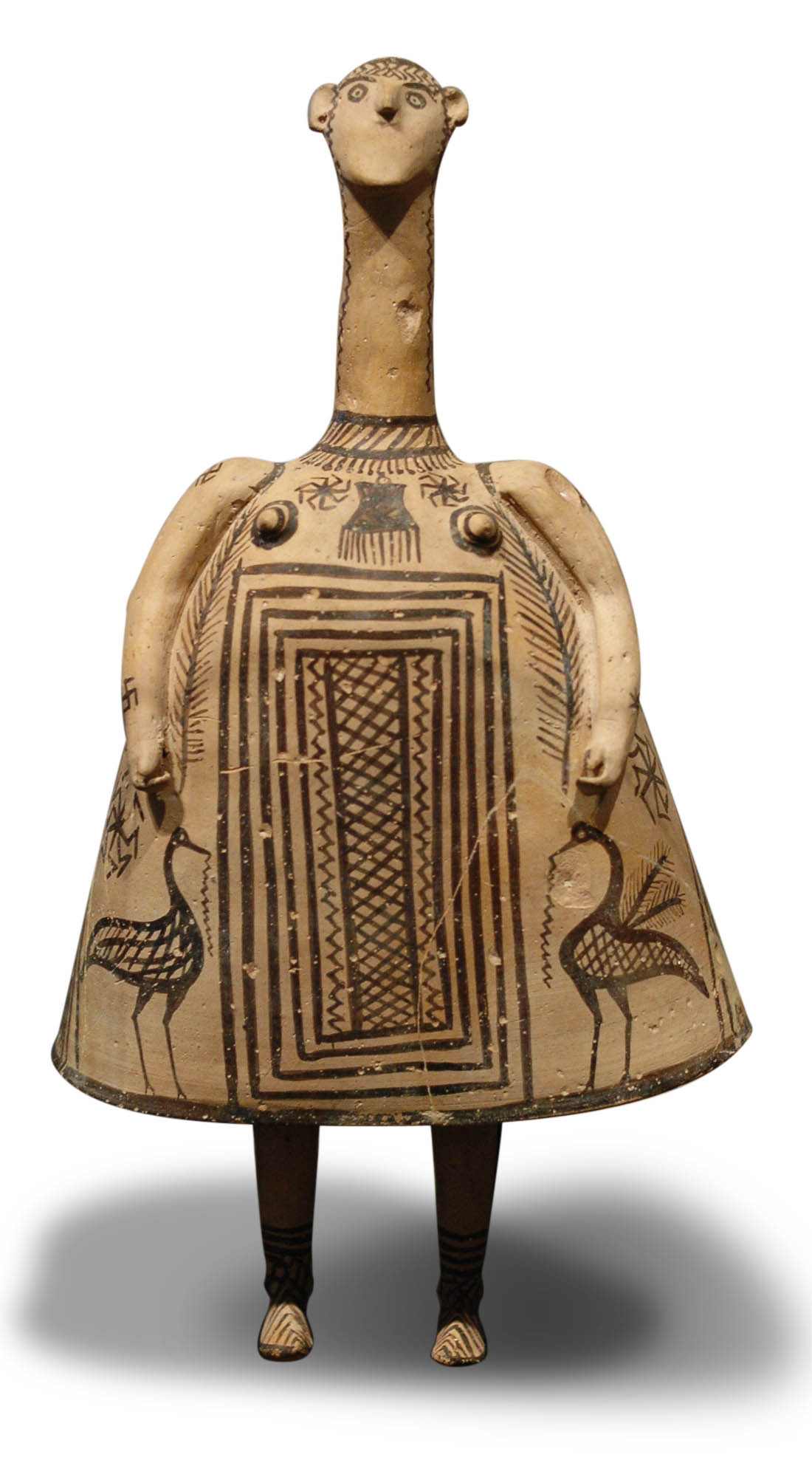
Idol from the late Geometric period, Thebes

By the end of the 2nd millennium BC, however, all these cultures had collapsed, beginning what has been called the Greek Dark Ages. For reasons not yet fully elucidated, the local population declined drastically, the economy collapsed, writing ceased to be practised, the arts regressed, and the repertoire of figurative representation disappeared almost completely. It was only after the mid–eighth century BC that a progressive social rearrangement took place, incorporating invaders from the Balkans and the remnants of the indigenous peoples, which would make possible a cultural resurgence that would be uninterrupted until the conquest of Greece by the Romans in the second century BC.

A period still precedes the Archaic proper, the Geometric, in which figurative representation is gradually re-established, in an almost entirely new foundation of visual language. Its sculpture was probably influenced by the art of the invading peoples, who brought with them an analytical tendency to design the works in distinct sections and in essential forms, being almost only silhouettes – a triangle for the torso, a circle for the head, and so on. The older geometric bronzes are very flat, and seem to have been created as cut-outs of metal plates, and show rustic features. Terracotta pieces show a more complete volumetry. Later bronzes are similar in this respect, following the development of the casting technique, and space begins to be explored more through pieces depicting chariots and group compositions. In the case of the human figures, gender distinctions are sketchy: the men are naked and the women clothed; when in the rare cases where they are naked, they show breasts but not genitals.

== The Archaic period ==
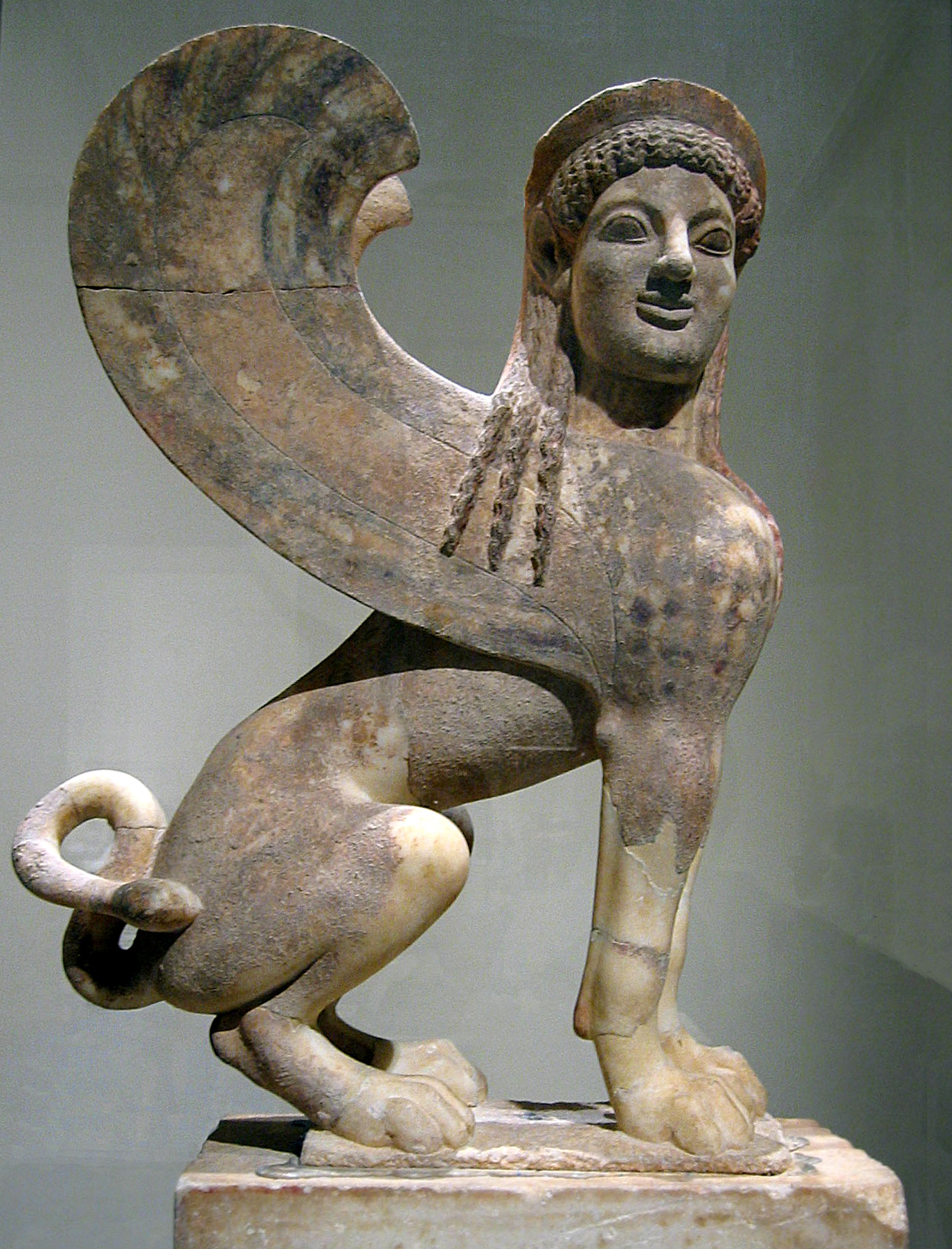
Sphinx, c. 530 BC, Attica

The Greece of the Archaic period was experiencing a rapid recovery after the hiatus of the Dark Ages and the first cultural renaissance of the 8th century BC. A new form of government was developed, structured in the city-state, the polis, the economy was strengthened and a movement of wide colonial expansion began, increasing trade with peoples of a vast region bordering the Mediterranean and the Black Sea, creating a feeling of unity and cultural strength that disseminated the Hellenic culture throughout that territory, a culture that fraternized in and was consecrated in the Panhellenic Games, held in the metropolis. Literature experienced a resurgence and found its first great exponents in Hesiod and Homer, and philosophy researched new ways to understand the world and man under a rationalist viewpoint, in which supernatural explanations for the phenomena of nature were abandoned in search of more scientific causes.

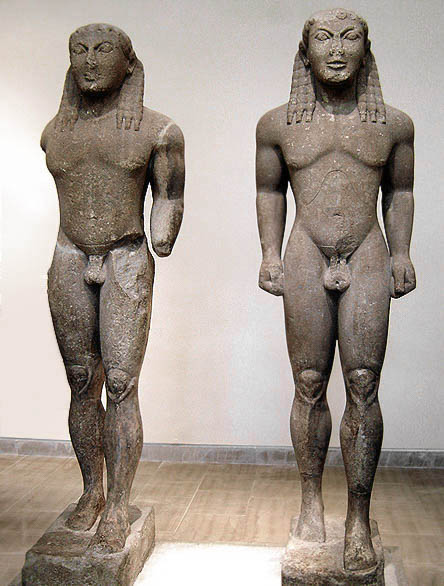
Kleobis and Biton, Delphi Archaeological Museum, Polymedes of Argos, c. 585 BC.

The process of formation of the city-state required a more consistent social organization than that maintained in the ancient villages, hamlets and scattered demes, which functioned under the direction of a leader, king or chief magistrate, the basileus, and to consolidate this new political union it was necessary that the centralized power be divided among a group of aristocrats, aided by bureaucrats, in a sharing of responsibilities that laid the first foundations of the future democracy. The polis model was not adopted uniformly throughout Greece: variations are found, and certain regions continued to be governed in the ancient way until a late period, but the polis ultimately represents the most advanced and efficient system of the time, better managing rapid population growth, commercial and colonial expansion, productive resources, and political and military relations among the various states. It was also where the most important artistic progress took place. The transfer of power to the assembly of hereditary aristocrats, who held most of the wealth and owned most of the land, naturally made the principles of this class dominant, while they were concerned with maintaining the status quo through despotic methods of exploiting the lower classes. In the 6th century BC, the power of this oligarchy began to be dissolved with the rise of the tyrants, with the assimilation to the government of smallholder families alien to the circle of the landowning aristocrats, and with the emergence of a self-sufficient middle class that survived and began to grow rich through trade, social strata that were morally justified by defending the value of work, considered a valid way to obtain the prizes that Homer thought reserved for heroes: wealth, glory and the favor of the gods.

The social context was thus restructured, and conducive to a full restoration of cultural activity, fostered by a rich and cultured ruling class, which debated philosophy and literature in the symposium, took great interest in art, practised patronage and allowed artists freedom for formal research, adapting the influence of Eastern art to the different context of the polis, a freedom that was essential for a socially significant filling of the artistic vacuum of the Dark Ages. Then, from the end of the 8th century BC, when the Archaic period begins, a true figurative explosion takes place, after its virtual extinction in the previous phase. It is assumed that the resurgence of writing was driven by a desire to fix in the collective memory the heroic deeds of the past and the religious traditions, in a phase in which the relations between past and present became central to the culture, reading the myths as sources of instruction for the solution of new problems of everyday life. The theme of the Archaic poets revolved around this, just as it was an inspiring motif for vase painting and sculpture. It must also be remembered that if several generic traits are evident in Archaic culture – and this summary works in this direction – none of the various regions of Greece in this period can be considered typical and fully representative, and it must be pointed out that the artistic and cultural evolution of the so-called "Greece" of that time took place mostly in the center-south, where the model of the polis flourished, while the north remained comparatively underdeveloped and living in the regime of the ancient tribes and clans, the ethnos.

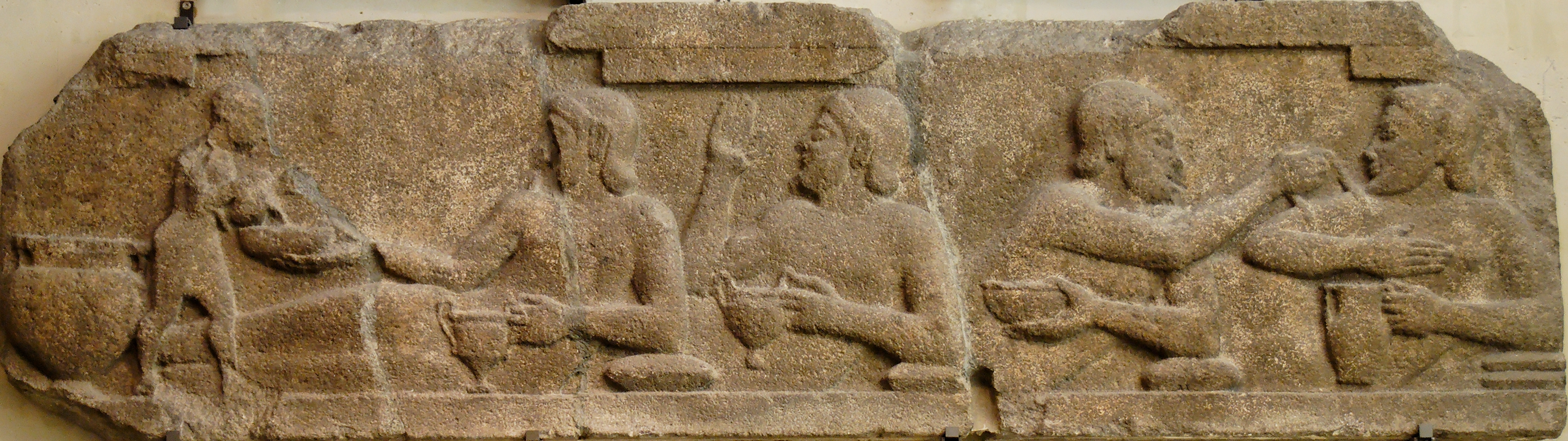
Symposium scene, c. 575–500 BC, Assos

=== Kouros and kore ===
Stylistically the Archaic period begins with a phase called Dedalic or Orientalizing which, as this name suggests, betrays the influx of elements from the East. From there, Greek craftsmen learned to produce terracotta reliefs in series from molds, a practice that defined stereotyped formal solutions for the representation of the human figure that would become the basis for the organization of full-figure statuary as well. The scheme of these works was strictly standardized, homogenizing the entire production of figurative sculpture and eliminating all traces of creative freedom and naturalism found in the statues of the times of the Egyptian cultures. The bodies assume a hieratic posture, in a frontal position, arms hanging down at their sides or one folded at the chest, one leg in advance suggesting movement, with long curly hair and facial expression fixed in a smile outline. Following the example of the geometric bronzes, the men are naked, and the women are dressed in elaborate costumes. This typology, known as kouros in the male case, and kore in the female, was the most important during the Archaic period. It seems to have derived from Cycladic statues, and would be definitely consolidated from c. 650 BC, acquiring a monumental dimension possibly inspired by the example of Egyptian statuary, known by the Greeks who established some colonies there and by travelers.

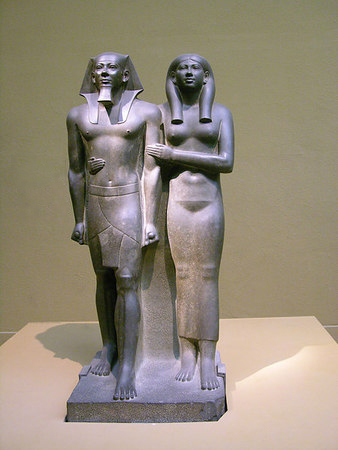
Egyptian statue of Menkaure and Khamerernebty II, Fourth Dynasty

The Egyptian influence is sometimes disputed or minimized, but the apparent similarity is obvious, and modern studies have found consistent identity between the proportions of most of the kouroi with the Second Canon of the 26th Egyptian dynasty, a canon that with minor variations was practically the same as the one that had been in use since the time of the great pyramids millennia ago. This formal identity confirms a reference that had been made by Diodorus, even though the foreign model was adapted on several points, mainly regarding costume and structural support bases.

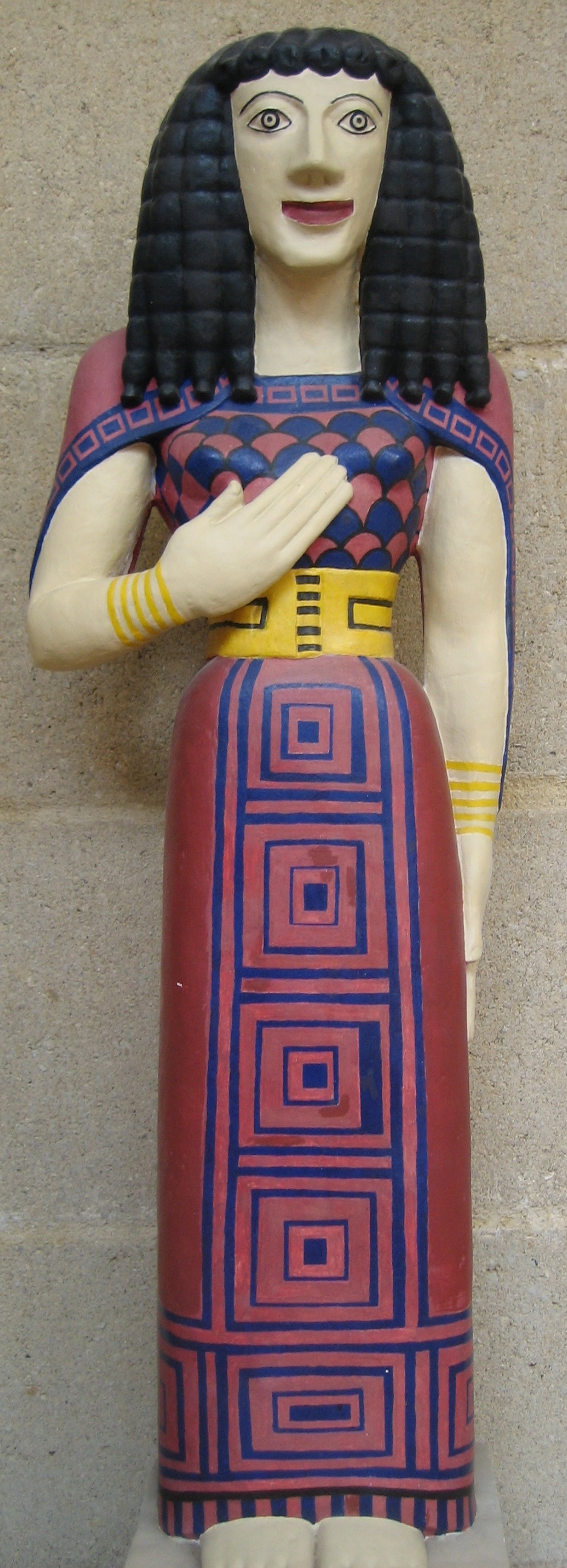
The Lady of Auxerre, kore from the Dedalic period, c. 640–630 BCE, Crete. Modern copy with reconstructed polychromy.

The kouroi and korai are found in bronze, terracotta and ivory, but by far the most usual is stone. Their dimensions vary from small statues to giants such as the kouroi of Delos and Samos, and the unfinished colossi of Naxos, the largest of which reach nearly 10 m. Their usual size, however, is the human size or a little smaller. They served various functions, such as cult statues, ex-votos, monuments celebrating athletes, and funeral markers. The chronology of the works is uncertain and dates are generally approximate, because the evolution of form was fairly homogeneous throughout Greece, without the emergence of significantly differentiated regional schools, and all innovations was quickly adopted by all centers of production.

The kouros is especially important because of its nudity, which offered a free ground for research into human anatomy. But even though this anatomy started from rather crude and elementary features at the beginning of the period, and reached a considerable degree of naturalism in the transition to the Severe period, its representation is full of conventionalism and thought in terms of abstract planes and lines. At no time does there seem to have been a concern to establish a true resemblance to nature in the sense of a portrait. The kouroi are not portraits, but generic and symbolic representations, and their very lack of differentiation enabled them to fill various functional niches in Archaic culture. This impersonality is explained, according to Jeffrey Hurwit, because in the Archaic world the main goal of the sculptor was to offer a convincing, rather than realistic, piece, for the most constant and pressing impulse of this art "was to formalize, to define general patterns, to recreate nature in an intelligible form," consistent with the formalist and hierarchical principles of the cultured aristocracy that commissioned these works. In this sense the kouroi are emblems of conservatism, because if, in detail, they showed clear changes over the nearly two centuries of the type's prevalence, the general pattern did not change significantly.

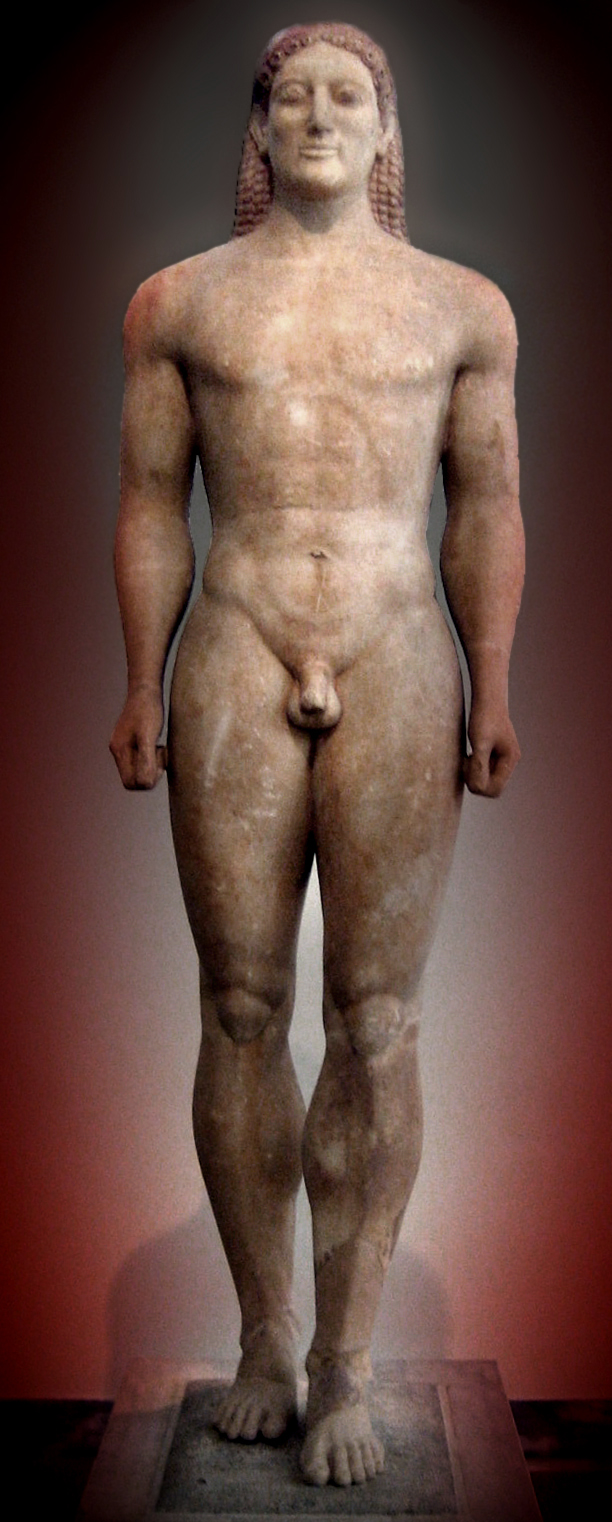
Kroisos Kouros, c. 525 BC, Anavissos

At the same time, the naked kouros became a significant typology because the public nudity of the warrior and athlete became socially accepted in certain situations, and an identification began between physical beauty and the collection of moral values known as arete, in a broad concept called kalos kagathos. When an athlete won a contest in the Games, the greatest of the Hellenic gatherings, his or her consecration was vested with a transcendent meaning and raised the man to the level of the divine, evoking, as we read in Pindar, the feats of the gods and heroes. The athlete's physical qualities – strength, agility, skill, grace, and beauty – were made explicit in his or her nakedness, but eminently religious, civic, and ethical values were attributed to it. Thus nudity became an artistic motif in itself, making visible spiritual and moral virtues and forming an artistic typology of long descent, that of heroic nudity. Just as the horrid face of the Gorgon installed on the facades of many temples inspired sacred fear in the devotee, the bodily strength and beauty and the smile of the kouros referred to charis, divine grace. The same qualities were recalled to the viewer when the kouros fulfilled the function of a memorial or votive offering.

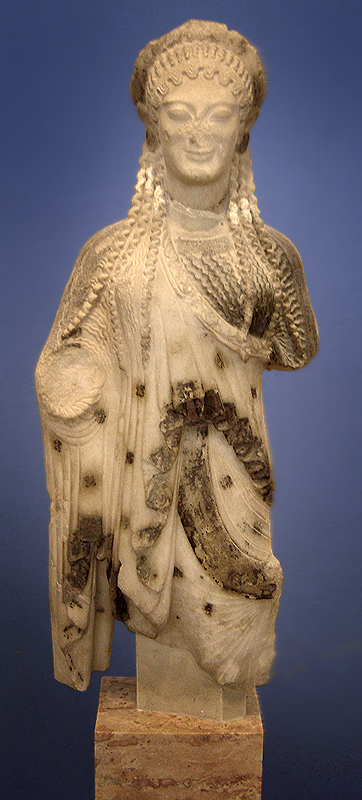
A richly attired kore

The earliest kouroi have been interpreted by archaeologists as images of Apollo, a god strongly associated with beauty and youth. This theory was strengthened by the finding of a huge group of about 120 statues at the sanctuary of Apollo Ptoös in Boeotia. But while in many cases this association may be valid, many kouroi have been found in other contexts and dedicated to other gods. In any case, their type is clearly Apollonian, illustrating an ideal of youth and beauty, and for this reason it is also licit to assume that they were at least in part erotic representations, for in addition to Apollo's having had in the myth several homosexual relationships, the statues bear the features desirable in a man of that time – broad shoulders, strong buttocks and thighs, thin waist, and small penis – in a male-dominated society that had institutionalized pederasty as an honorable practice, imbued with educational values.

In the case of the korai the prototype is more varied. They are always dressed, but their poses range from ritual immobility to images that suggest dancers in action. Many of them carry offerings. The representation of dresses and sophisticated hairstyles offered yet another field for the sculptor to find diversified decorative solutions and multiple surface treatments, exploring graphics, textures, and transparency effects. While the kouroi illustrate the conceptions and ideals of the male world, the korai offer a sensitive portrait of the values prized in the women of Archaic society – good taste revealed in the use of clothing, jewelry, and sophisticated hairstyles, and youth, beauty, and health as symbols of the ability to bear children – and also indirectly indicated the wealth of the man with whom they were associated, giving a measure of who she was and how she was perceived in her group. One current school of thought leans toward reading korai as objects of sexual desire, but for Hurwit their probable primary functions as offerings and cult images does not support this hypothesis.

On the other hand, korai seem to have played a unique role as instruments of social bonding when they were offered as gifts. They often bear inscriptions describing them as agalmata, a word that in Classicism simply meant a statue of a god, but which in the Archaic period had much broader connotations, and was associated with concepts of abundance, wealth, and status, inserting the statues in a network of symbolic and material exchanges among men that mobilized sacred and profane powers and established strong bonds of interpersonal dependence. A kore was a material possession, but its value could not be estimated in monetary terms, and if it indirectly pointed the woman as an object or instrument in a male culture, at the same time it put her in a high rank, being considered a source of prestige and holding many privileges. Only one kouros was found as a dedication that describes it as agalma. The korai are also interpreted differently from the kouroi when they are used as funeral markers. By carrying an offering in their hand, they force a visual engagement with the viewer in a sense of exchange, of dialogue, which is not the case with kouroi, and, according to Robin Osborne, this characteristic of the kore indicates that the woman was in fact the axis, the substance, and the main interlocutor in the whole universe of exchange in the archaic male world.

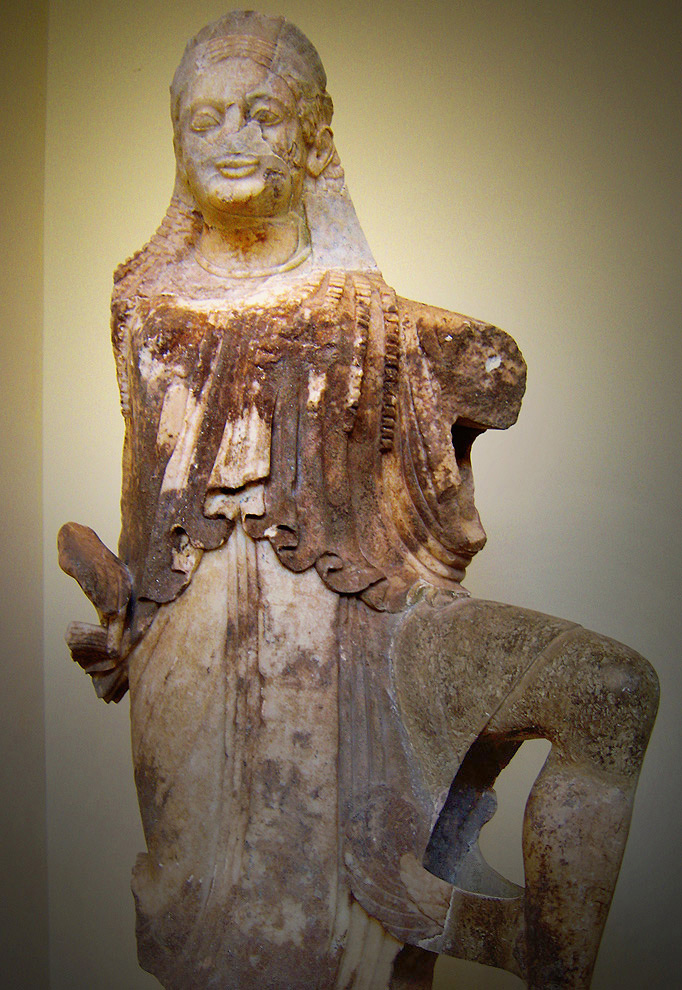
Kore dancer. Delphi Archeological Museum

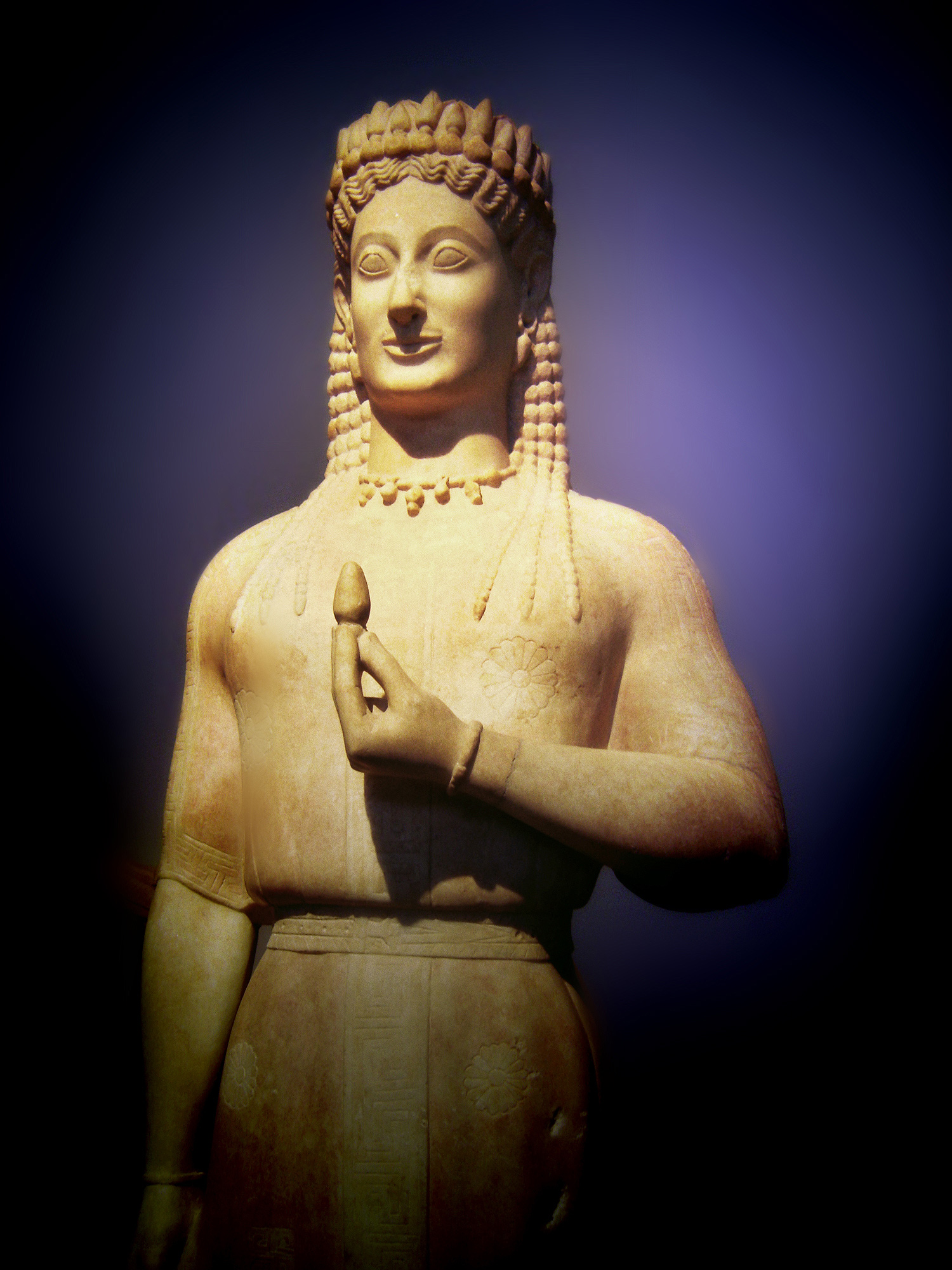
Kore Phrasikleia, c. 540 BC, Athens

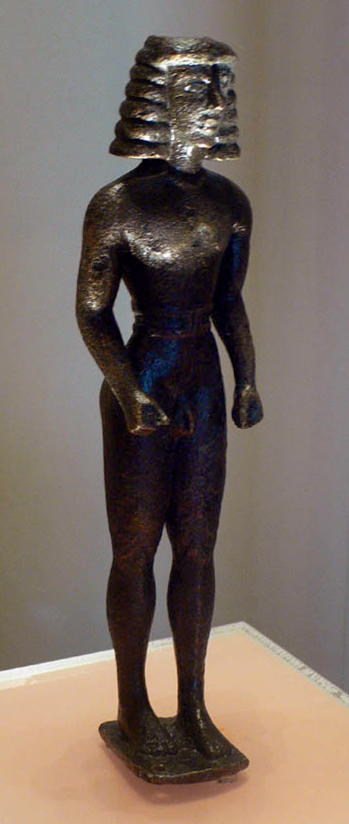
Kouros statuette, c. 620 BC, Crete

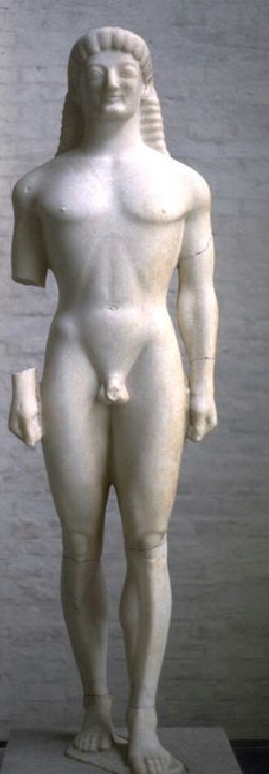
The famous Apollo of Tenea, a kouros from c. 560–550 BC

=== Architectural decoration ===
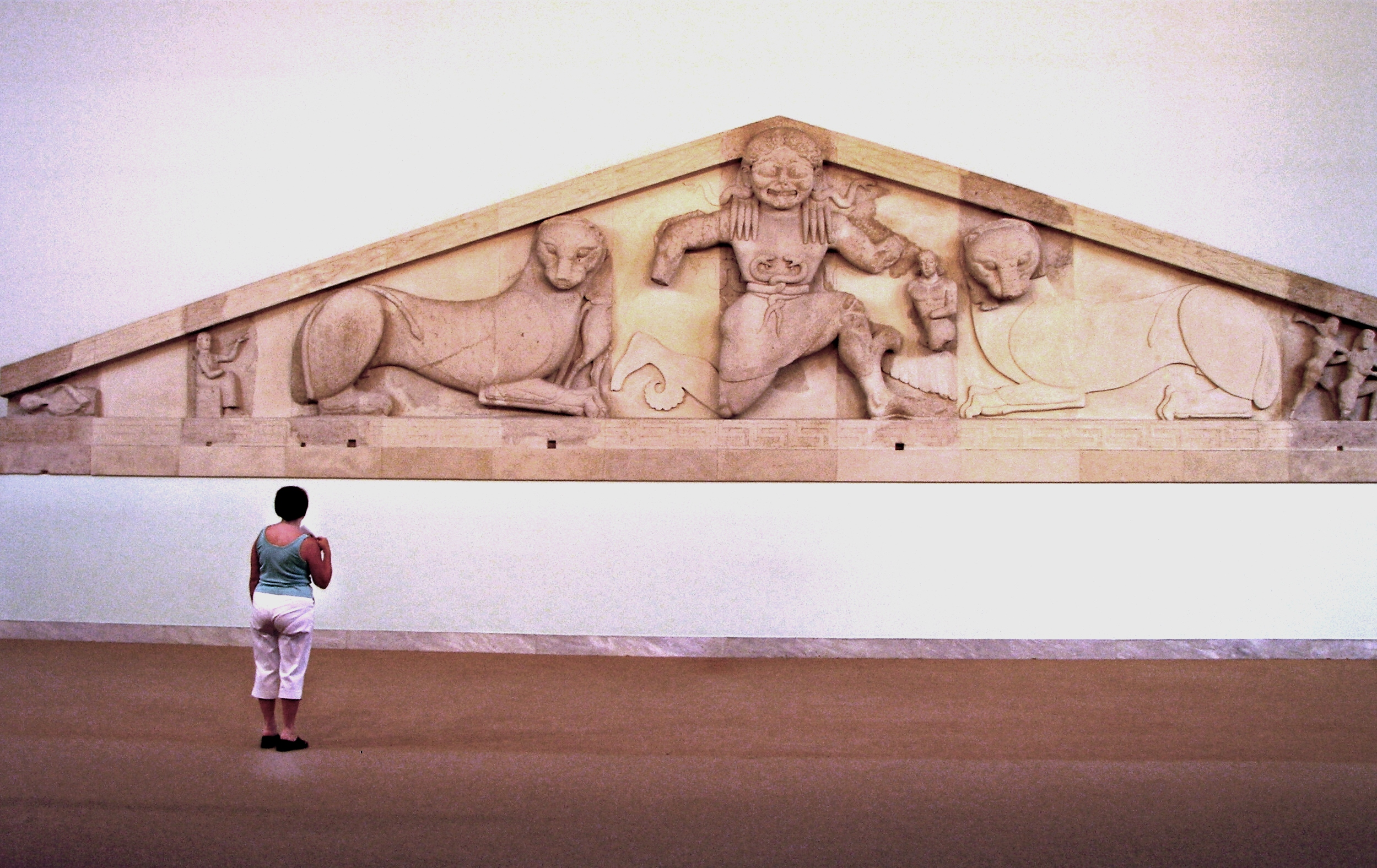
Fronton of the temple of Athena in Corcyra depicting a Gorgon in the Knielauf (running-kneeling) pose characteristic of Archaic Greek art, c. 580 BC.

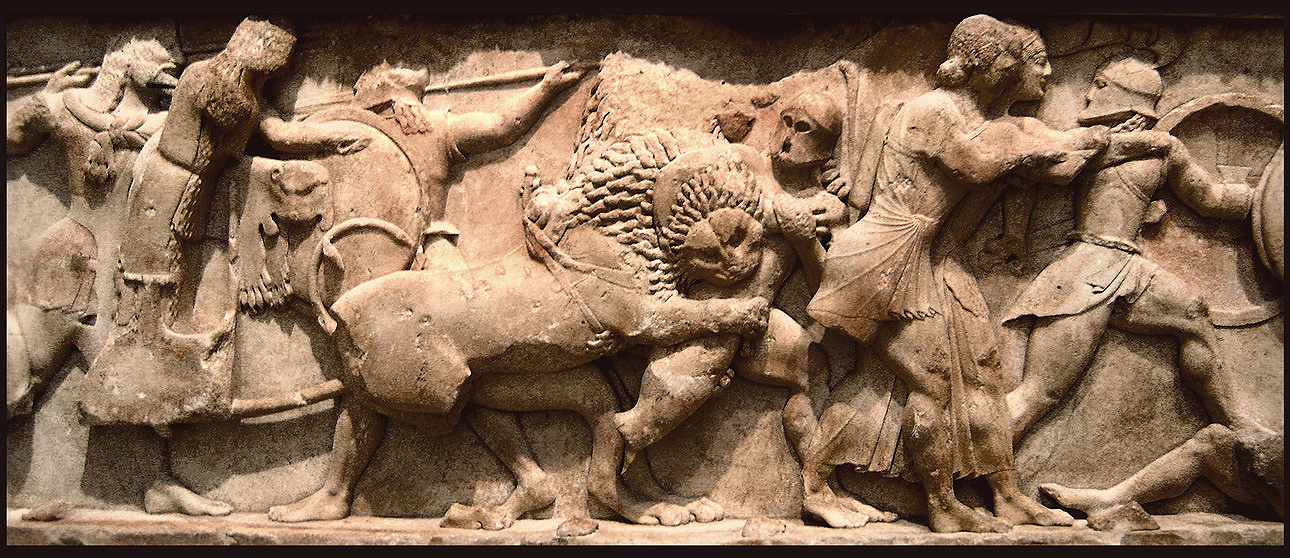
Detail of the frieze of the Treasury of Siphno, at Delphi, c. 525 BC.

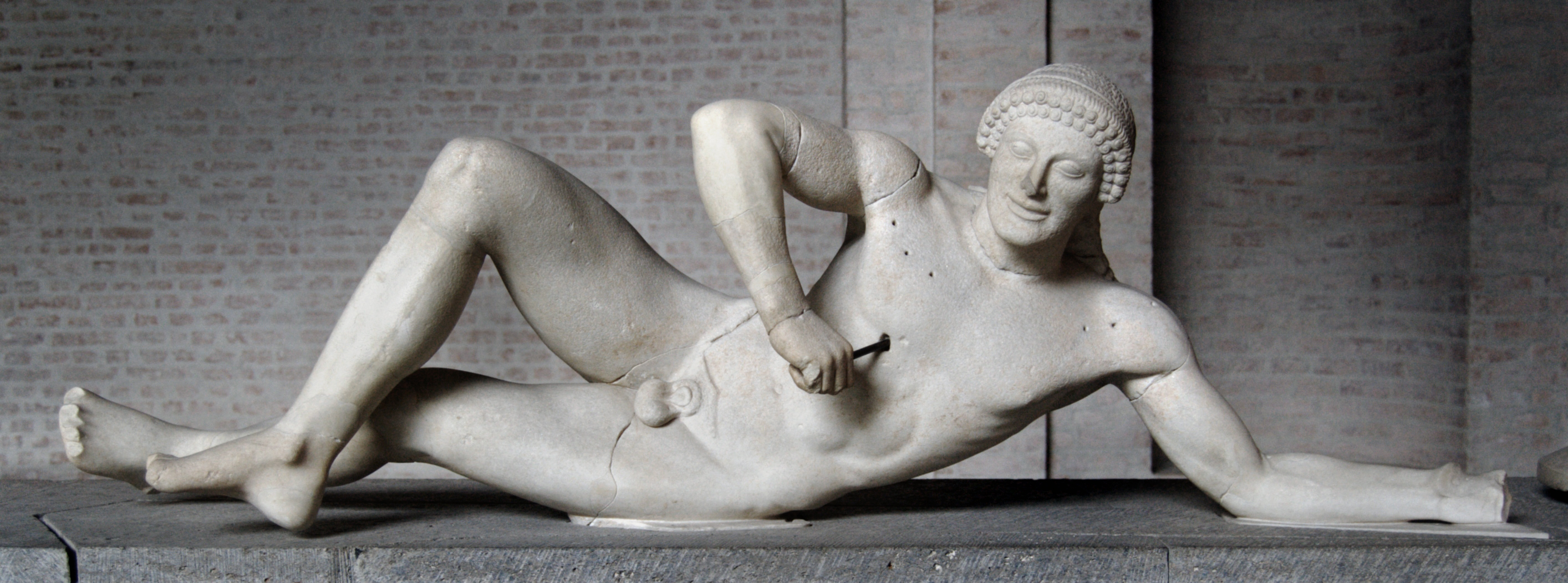
Warrior from the west pediment of the temple of Athena Aphia, in Aegina, c. 505–490 BCE.

In pre-Archaic times there was only a sparse use of sculpture in the decoration of buildings. In the Archaic period the architectural orders were established, which redefined the conception of the temple and gave it a monumental dimension unprecedented in the history of ancient Greek architecture, and decorative sculpture became much more frequent and extraordinarily important, both because of the magnitude of the compositions that were created and because they represented a much freer field of formal research than the fixed typologies of kouros and kore. The new Greek temple gave rise to narrative group scenes, unheard of in its time, favored anatomical and kinesiological research, created new challenges for the conception of sets, stimulated the exploration of light and shadow effects, and made its sculptors the founders of an original way of understanding plasticity and representation. Socially, the importance of figural decoration in sacred buildings was linked to the numinous character of the environment. The friezes showing processions and religious festivals, mythological scenes, images of the gods and fantastic creatures, which together created a particular ritual atmosphere, different from that of the profane world, which deeply sensitized the visitor and prepared him psychologically for divine worship.

The materials used for this were varied, ranging from bronze to terracotta, stone and stucco, always brightly colored. It seems that in the Orientalizing period the decorators' preference was for installing figurative groups in the areas most accessible to the eye, near the ground and on the walls. This trend suddenly changed around 630–600 BC, when the preferred locations became the upper parts of buildings, such as pediments, metopes, and acroteria. The first known example of this new practice is the sanctuary of Apollo, in Aetolia, which inaugurates this custom with great richness and variety, including mythological scenes and a profusion of figures of animals and fantastic beings such as mermaids, sphinxes and Gorgons. However, not all temples received figurative decoration.

The example of this sanctuary was soon followed in other regions, which also began to explore other uses for sculpture. In the colony of Corcyra, antefixes with human heads and water drains in the shape of animal heads were developed, which soon reached a level of excellence in the decoration of the local temple dedicated to Hera, impressive for its continuous frieze composed of wide-eyed faces alternating with lions with open mouths. By the mid-6th century BC figurative decoration on sacred buildings was common practice throughout Greece, with important examples in several places, such as the sanctuaries of Apollo in Aegina, of Hera in Olympia, of Artemis in Ephesus, and the Acropolis of Athens, where a gigantomachia of colossal dimensions was erected. At the same time, similar solutions were beginning to be applied in civil constructions.

In the late Archaic phase, particularly interesting are the friezes of the Treasury of Syphnos, in the sanctuary of Apollo at Delphi, which show a very advanced degree of compositional fluency and technical skill, which in many respects prefigure Classical art. The ultimate and most brilliant flowering of Archaic architectural sculpture are the pediments of the Temple of Aphaea at Agina, completed around 500–480 BC. Their figures are of enormous refinement and elegance in finish and lines, and the variety of postures and solutions of movement, the detailing of anatomy, and the suggestion of diversified emotional expressions, despite the invariable Archaic smile, introduce notes of drama precursory to the developments of the psychological art of the Severe style and of Hellenistic sculpture. Its sculptural ensembles are considered one of the finest achievements of Greek art of all time.

=== Cult statues and ex-votos ===
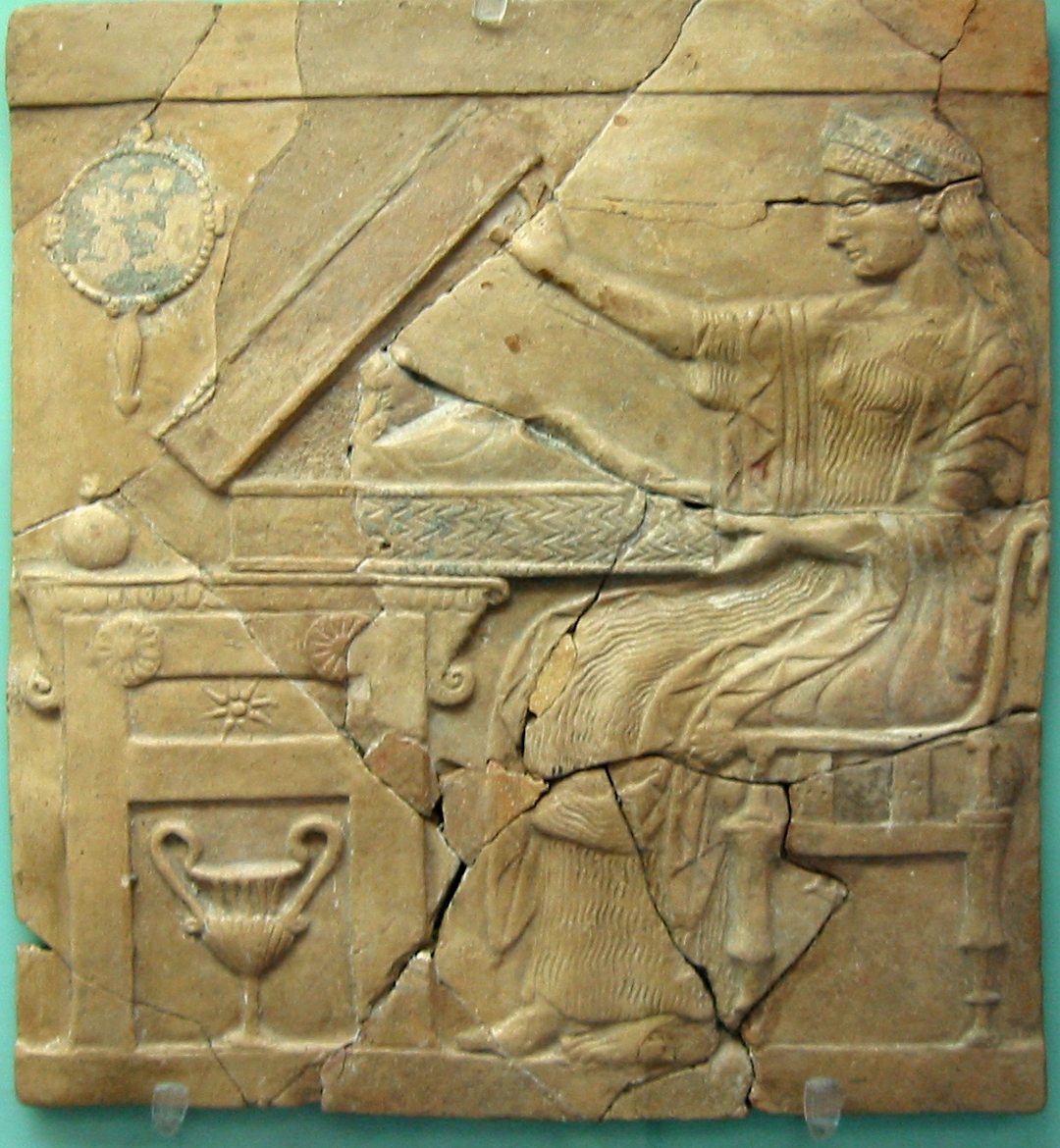
Persephone Pinax opening the Likon Mystikon, Calabria

Closely associated with shrines and temples, cult statues were a vital part of Greek religion as vehicles of communication between deities and men. A multitude of taboos surrounded them, and their effectiveness depended not so much on their physical features – some were almost pieces of raw material – but on the complex ritualistics they required. Some could not even be seen, others depended on special rites for their revelation, and in any case they were always charged with deep meaning. Their importance was such that they influenced, directly or through their oracles, even in civil and military matters of vast repercussion, such as wars and alliances. Several historical accounts refer to supernatural interventions by cult statues in the imminence of the decision of some crucial collective act, and the capture of the cult statues of a given city often entailed negative consequences for its sovereignty.

Similarly, the private possession of some prestigious image brought great social influence to its possessor, a cultural trait that was consistently exploited by the aristocracy to appropriate the charisma of divine power and create greater distance from the masses. Many of the cult statues were sculpted in the form of kouroi and korai, and their typical smile, in this context, is interpreted by Jeremy Tanner as a mirror of the stylization of the entire lives of the elites and their self-representation in the form of agalmata, objects in which the gods could take pleasure, as the aristocracy referred to themselves as geleontes, the smiling ones, distinguished by the gods for the wealth and prosperity they enjoyed. As ex-votos, monumental statues associated the aristocracy even more directly with the divine world, since only the wealthy could commission an important image, and the consecration of a statue implied the consecration of the offerer. At the same time, the aristocrats monopolized the priesthood, and access to the divine by the common people was dependent on concessions and conventions decided by the elite.

However, not all ex-votos had the outsized dimensions of the kouroi and korai. There are small sculptural relics documenting popular worship, with a diversity of motifs, often imitating sacrificial objects such as cakes, loaves of bread, and animals such as roosters, oxen, and pigeons. A very common form of ex-voto was the wooden plate painted with some religious or mythological scene, called pinax, but these have all disappeared owing to the fragility of the material, except for a handful found in Corinth. Versions in terracotta, ivory and stone carved in relief still exist in significant numbers, however, of which the great majority are dedicated to Asclepius. Such images are an important source of knowledge of religious practices in the Archaic period.

=== Other forms ===
Enthroned figures appear quite frequently in art of the Archaic period. Typically, this posture was reserved for deities and personages of high esteem. Strabo states that in Archaic times images of worship of Athena were preferably represented in this position, but the relics we know of (about eighty examples) as a rule do not show enough distinctive features to identify the deity. In the origin of the type the great majority were female images; the few male ones could figure Dionysus, magistrates or heroes. In the 6th century BC the model spread, depicting figures of both sexes, and could be found in a variety of contexts – funeral, votive-religious and commemorative.

Also interesting was the typology of large equestrian figures, though limited to the regions of Attica and its dependency Delos. Their origin is obscure; the examples of bronze and terracotta statuettes from earlier times do not suggest a direct formal descent – rather it seems that their design derived from vase painting of the early 6th century BC. The type flourished in Attica as a reflection of the aristocratic life of Athens, where several elite families had in their names components derived from hippos 'horse'; moreover the horse was an animal associated with Athena and Poseidon, the gods who in the founding myth of the city disputed its sovereignty, and so the depiction of knights took on special political and religious significance in the region. A fine example is the Rampin Rider, illustrated in detail at the opening of this article. Finally, other secondary forms in Archaic sculpture are the figures of fantastic animals such as griffins and sphinxes, or real ones such as lions and horses, funerary stelae, commemorative columns, and some vases with sculptural elements.

== Artists ==
There are several names recorded in ancient literature of sculptors of the Archaic period, but of most of them we only know the name and some brief allusion to their works, almost all of which have disappeared, with very rare exceptions. From the 6th century, Butades is mentioned, said to be the first to model in terracotta, an art said to have been brought to Etruria by Euquir, Diopius and Eugramo. Reco and his son Theodore of Samos were credited by Pausanias as the inventors of bronze casting, contradicting modern research; Glaucus was considered the inventor of soldering, and Archermus is said to have been the first to depict Nike and Eros with wings. Others are Bathycles, who made a throne decorated with embossments and a statue of Artemis; Canachus, author of two large statues of Apollo; Endoeus, Dipoenus and Scyllis, who are said to have been disciples of the mythical Daedalus. In the passage from the 6th to the 5th century, the school of Argos became important, with Ageladas as one of its exponents, famous as the author of statues of athletes and as the master of Phidias, Polykleitos, and Myron. In this period also appear Antenor, to whom is attributed the group of Tyrannicides and a kore preserved in Athens, and Hegias, whom Pliny points out as one of Phidias's rivals.

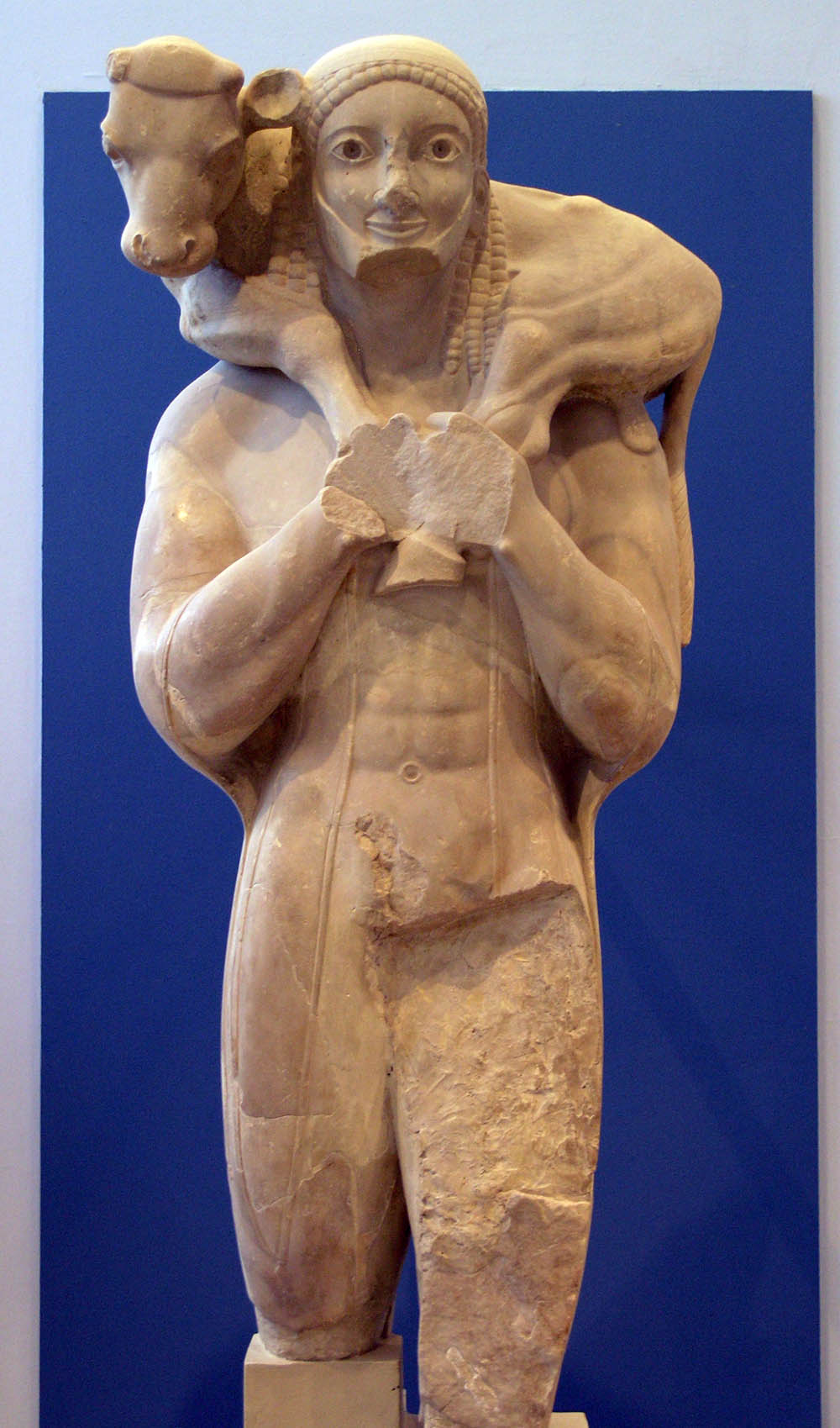
Kouros moscophoros, c. 560 BC, Athens. Probably an ex-voto.

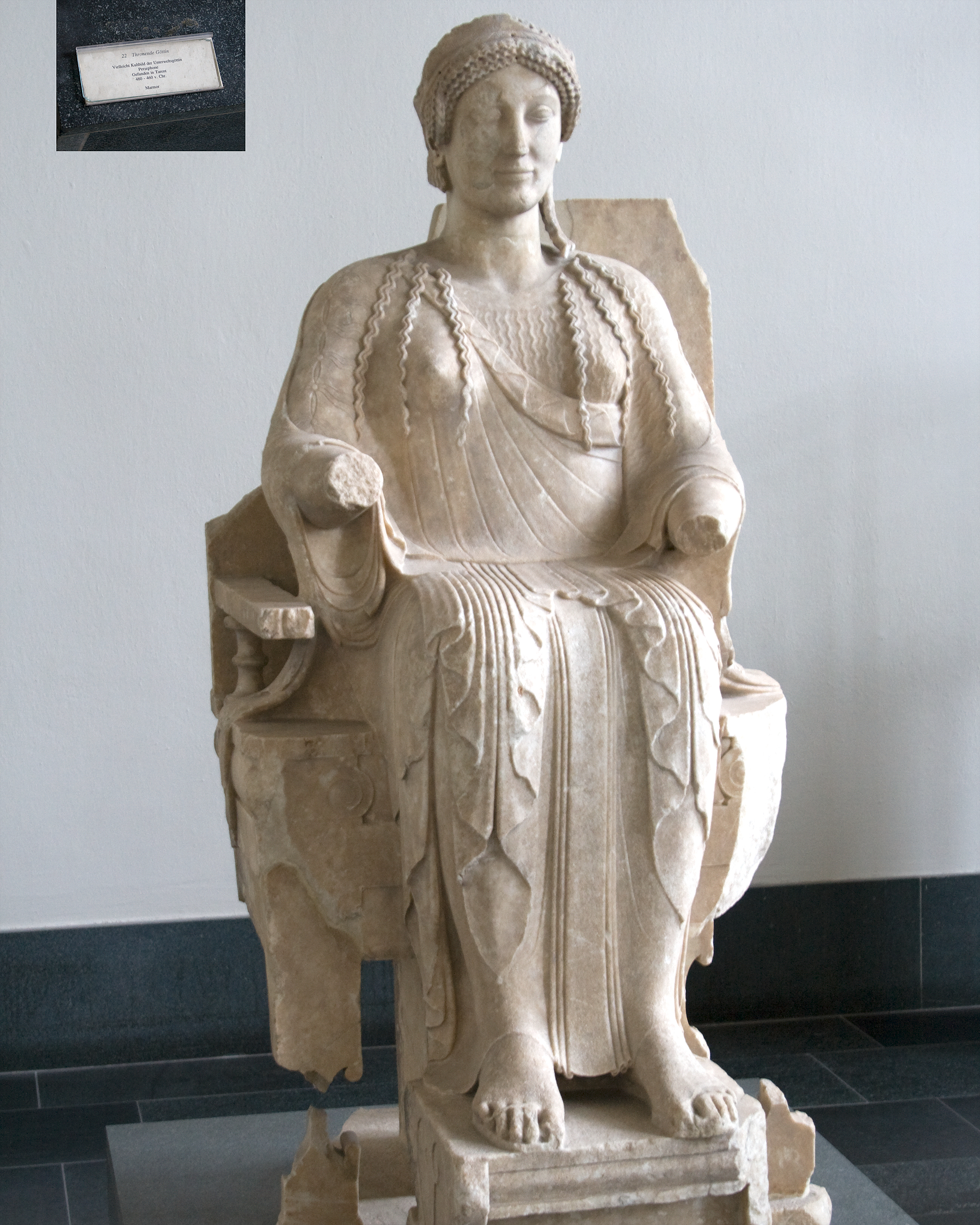
Enthroned Persephone, c. 460 BC, Taranto. A late example of the Archaic style.

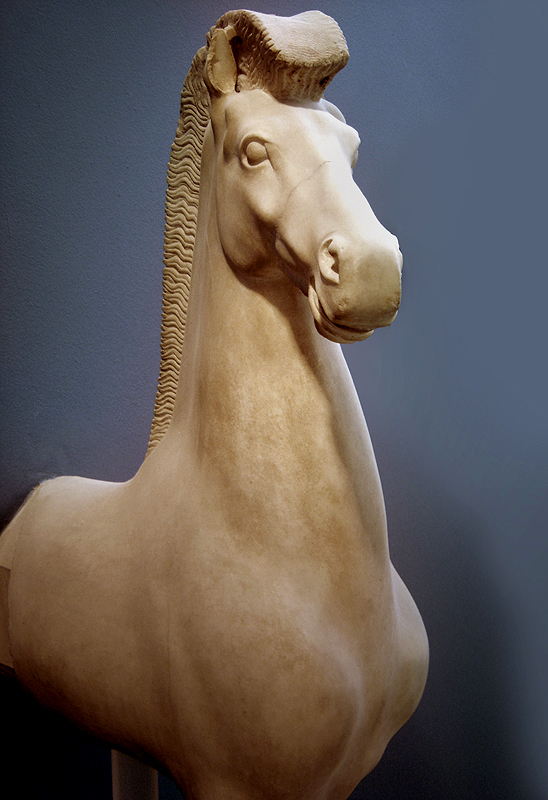
Horse, c. 515 BC, Athens

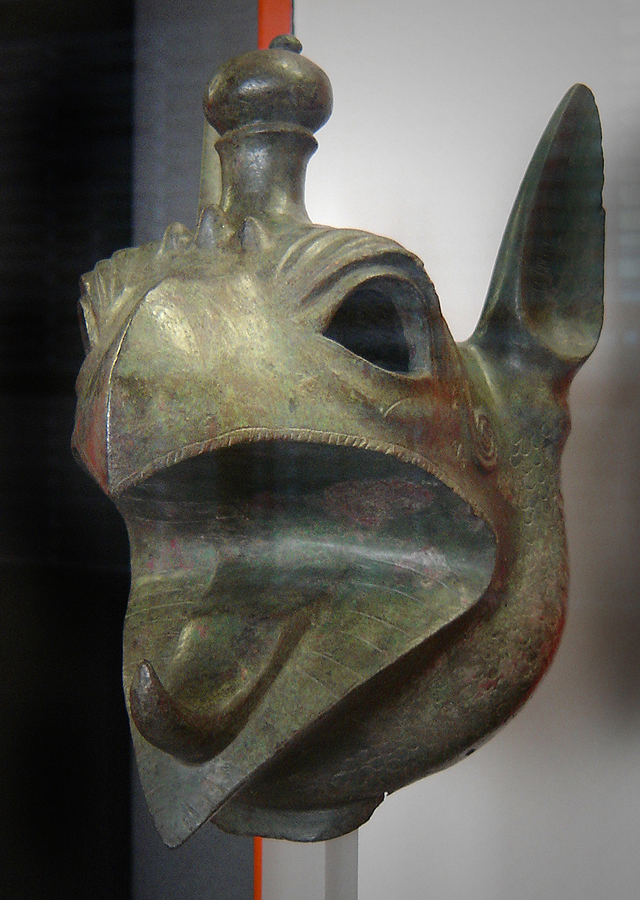
Griffon head, Delphi

== Legacy ==
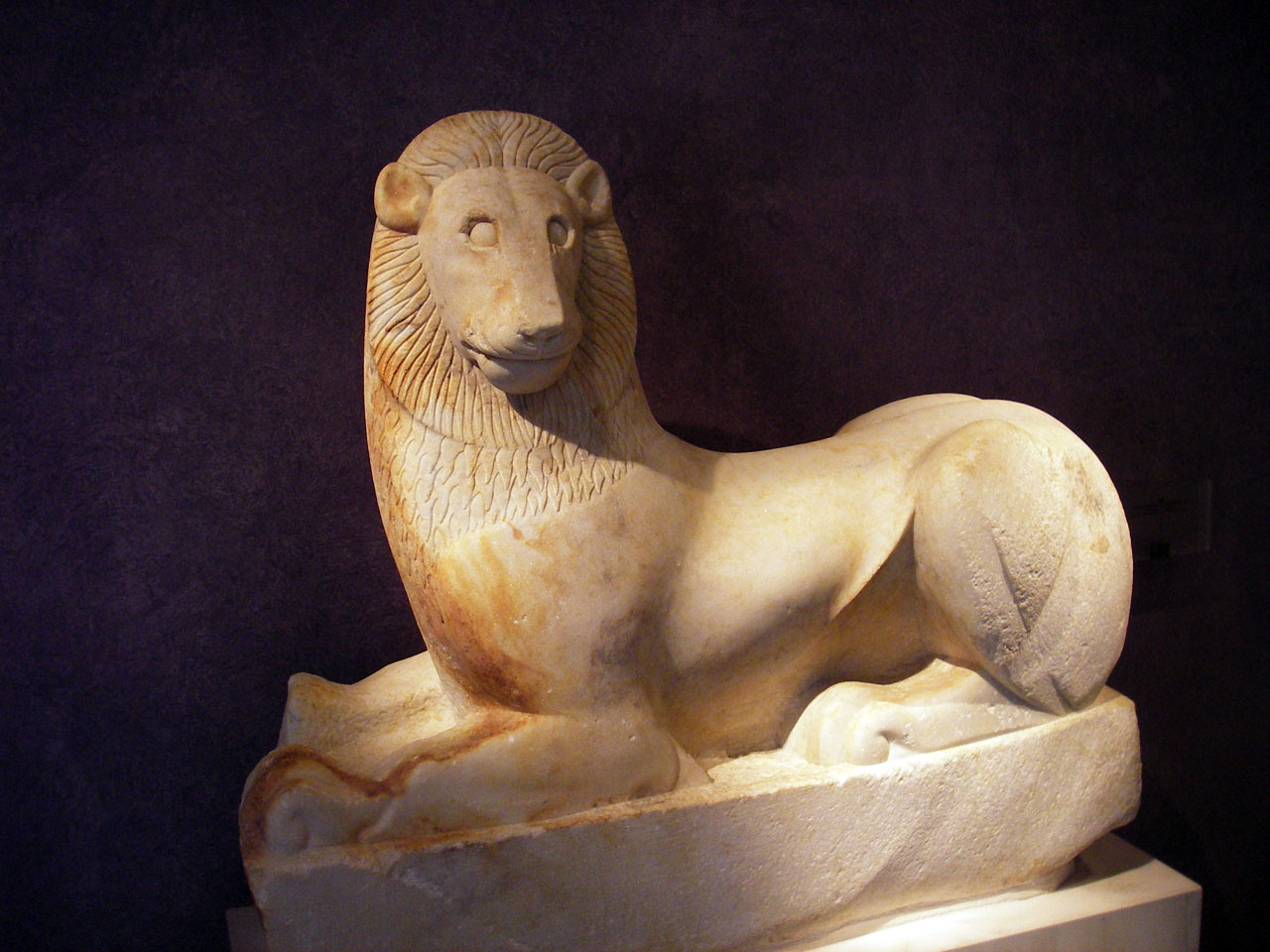
Lion of the Holy Door of Kerameikos, c. 590–580, Athens

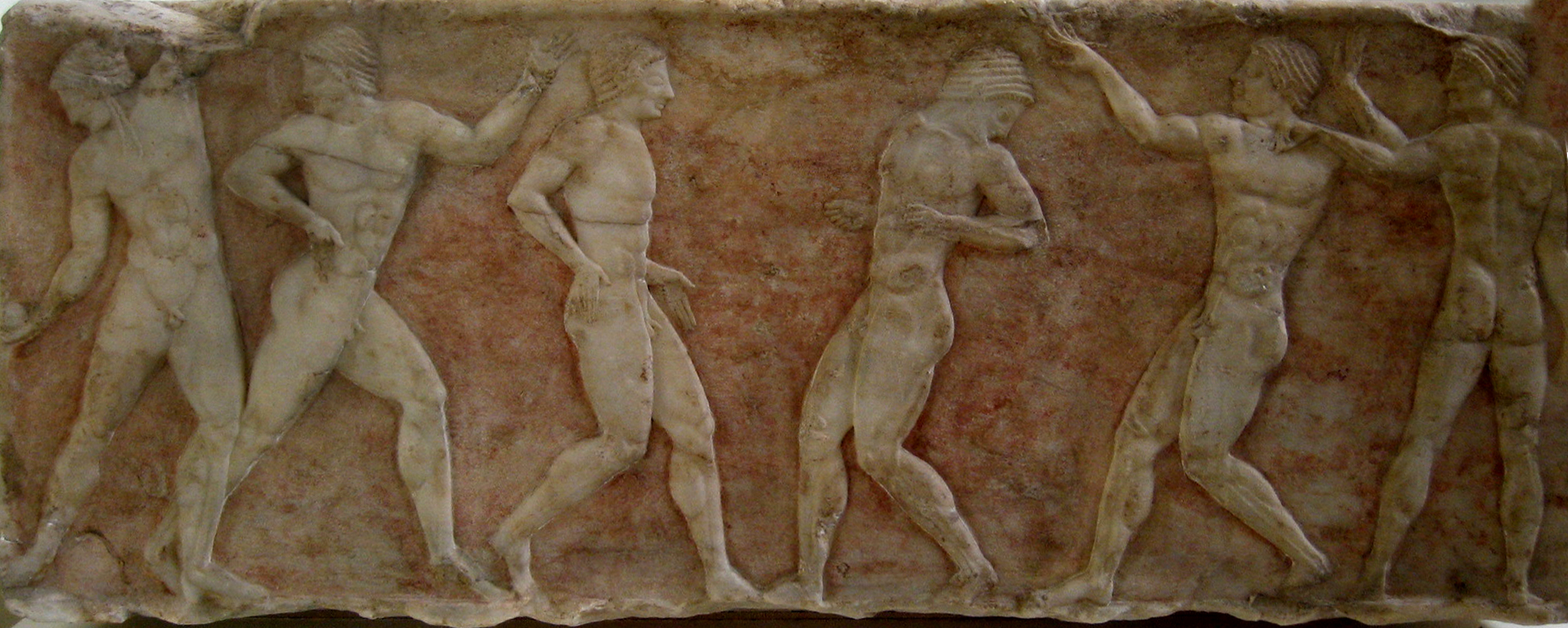
Statue base, c. 510, Athens

The influence of the Archaic style spread to other regions of the Mediterranean. Its absorption by the Greek colonies was a natural process, but it also inspired the formulation of the national Etruscan style of sculpture in the Italian peninsula, where it was adapted to the local context, abandoning stone as the material of choice in favor mainly of terracotta, even for architectural decoration. Cyprus, Phoenicia, and parts of Asia Minor also accepted elements of Archaic sculpture in their artistic production, with distinct results, not always of high quality. Similarly, Persia incorporated in the 6th century some Greek traits into its artistic style.

The Archaic style dissolved with the decline of the aristocracy and the rise of the democracy and bourgeoisie, and with the change in some basic concepts about the functions and properties of art mainly concerning mimesis, leading to a rapid introduction of an increasingly anatomically correct naturalism from the first decades of the 4th century BC, but its appeal did not completely disappear for sculptors. Classical artists such as Myron could still produce works in an Archaic style around 450 BC, and throughout Classical art one will find such statues, especially in the field of cult statues and herms, where this style was often considered best suited to lending the image a divine aura by its austere and abstract features, distancing it from the naturalism of profane and decorative creation. Pausanias, writing in the 2nd century BC, in the middle of the Hellenistic period, claimed to have found many Archaic works still in use in shrines. Hellenism, with its historicism and eclecticism, fostered the resurgence of ancient sculptural traditions, and small schools of Archaic sculpture were formed for a select audience, which included Roman collectors, including the Emperor Augustus.

In modern times, the first recognition of the Archaic style came with the discovery in 1811 of the sculptural groups from the temple of Aphia in Agina, which were taken to Munich and exhibited in 1830. Their enthusiastic discoverers described them as only inferior to the relics of the Parthenon in Athens, and exerted a certain influence on the elaboration of local Neoclassicism, but the find did not cause wider repercussions. By the 1840s, more interested analyses were already appearing, and at the end of the 19th century other Archaic finds contributed to a better knowledge of this art, even though it tended to be seen as a still imperfect preparation for classical production. Only after the 1920s did the typical characteristics of Archaic sculpture begin to be appreciated, although with some restrictions. With the multiplication of archaeological research and academic studies at the end of the twentieth century, the history of Archaic Greece began to be studied in its specificity, and the sculptural production of the period was duly rehabilitated both for its own merits and for having been the foundation of a long and extremely successful tradition, which had a profound and decisive influence on all the art of the West and certain Asian regions, and also as a reliable testimony of the culture that served as its source, and therefore an indispensable piece of information for the global understanding of that period.

== Bibliography ==
- ARCHIBALD, Zosia. "Northern Greece". In RAAFLAUB, Kurt & WEES, Hans van (eds). A Companion to Archaic Greece. John Wiley and Sons, 2009
- CASSON, Stanley. Some modern sculptors. Ayer Publishing, 1928–1967
- CUNNINGHAM, Lawrence & REICH, John. Culture and Values: a survey of the humanities. Cengage Learning, 2005
- EAVERLY, Mary Ann. Archaic Greek equestrian sculpture. University of Michigan Press, 1995
- GOLDHILL, Simon & OSBORNE, Robin. Rethinking revolutions through ancient Greece. Cambridge University Press, 2006
- GURALNIK, E. Proportions of Kouroi. AJA, 1978
- HEMINGWAY, Colette & HEMINGWAY, Seán. "Etruscan Art". In Heilbrunn Timeline of Art History. New York: The Metropolitan Museum of Art, 2000
- HURWIT, Jeffrey M. (2007). "The Human Figure in Early Greek Sculpture and Vase Painting". In SHAPIRO, Henry. The Cambridge companion to archaic Greece. Cambridge University Press, 2007
- HURWIT, Jeffrey M. (1985). The Art and Culture of Early Greece, 1100-480 B.C. Cornell University Press, 1985
- JANSON, Horst W. History of art: the Western tradition. Prentice Hall PTR, 2003.
- KLEINER, Fred. Gardner's Art Through the Ages: A Global History. Cengage Learning EMEA, 2008
- LEPSIUS, Richard. Letters from Egypt, Ethiopia, and the Peninsula of Sinai. H.G. Bohn, 1853
- MARCONI, Clemente. Temple decoration and cultural identity in the archaic Greek world. Cambridge University Press, 2007
- MATTUSCH, Carol C. Greek Bronze Statuary. Cornell University Press, 1988
- MORRIS, Ian. "The Eighth-century Revolution". In RAAFLAUB, Kurt & WEES, Hans van (eds). A Companion to Archaic Greece. John Wiley and Sons, 2009
- MORRIS, Sarah. Daidalos and the origins of Greek art. Princeton University Press, 1995
- MURRAY, Alexander S. A History of Greek Sculpture. Kessinger Publishing, 1880–2004.
- NAGY, Helen. "Divinity, Exaltation and Heroization: Thoughts on the Seated Posture in Early Archaic Greek Sculpture". In HARSTWICK, Kim J. & STURGEON, Mary Carol. Stephanos: studies in honor of Brunilde Sismondo Ridgway. UPenn Museum of Archaeology, 1998
- OSBORNE, Robin (1998). Archaic and Classical Greek Art. Oxford University Press, 1998
- OSBORNE, Robin (1994). "Looking on – Greek Style: Does the sculpted girl speak to women too?" In MORRIS, Ian (ed). Classical Greece: ancient histories and modern archaeologies. Cambridge University Press, 1994
- PATER, Walter. Greek Studies. BiblioBazaar, LLC, 2008
- PAUSANIAS. Description of Greece.
- POLLITT, Jerome. Art and experience in classical Greece. Cambridge University Press, 1972
- POMEROY, Sarah et al. Ancient Greece: A Political, Social, and Cultural history. Oxford University Press US, 1999.
- RICHTER, Gisela. Kouroi, Archaic Greek Youths: A study of the development of the Kouros type in Greek sculpture. Nova Iorque: Hacker Books, 1988
- ROBERTSON, Martin. A shorter history of Greek art. Cambridge University Press, 1981
- SANSONE, David. Ancient Greek civilization. Wiley-Blackwell, 2004.
- SNODGRASS, Anthony. Archaic Greece. University of California Press, 1981
- Society for the Diffusion of Useful Knowledge. The Penny Cyclopædia, Vol. XXI. Charles Knight & Co. 1841
- SPIVEY, Nigel. "Bionic Statues". In POWELL, Anton. The Greek world. Routledge, 1995
- STIEBER, Mary Clorinda. The poetics of appearance in the Attic korai. University of Texas Press, 2004
- STRATEN, Folkert T. van. Hierà kalá. BRILL, 1995.
- TANNER, Jeremy. The invention of art history in Ancient Greece. Cambridge University Press, 2006
- VERNANT, Jean-Pierre. Mortals and Immortals. Princeton University Press, 1991
- WATKIN, David. The Life and Work of C. R. Cockerell. Londres: A. Zwemmer, 1974
- WHITLEY, James (2009). "Crete". In RAAFLAUB, Kurt & WEES, Hans van (eds). A Companion to Archaic Greece. John Wiley and Sons, 2009
- WHITLEY, James (2001). The archaeology of ancient Greece. Cambridge University Press, 2001.
- WILSON, Nigel Guy. Encyclopedia of ancient Greece. Routledge, 2006
