= Tellus of Athens =

Athenian statesman

Tellus (Greek: Τέλλος) was an Athenian statesman featured in Herodotus's Histories, in which the wise man Solon describes him as the happiest man ever.

This characterization arose during an exchange between Solon and Croesus, the wealthy king of Lydia. When Croesus, flaunting his immense wealth, inquired of Solon if he knew of anyone happier than himself, Solon responded with his now-famous adage, 'Call no man happy until he is dead.' In this context, he cited Tellus as an exemplar of happiness, and referenced Tellus as a noteworthy example of his philosophy.

To quote Herodotus:

Tellus... had both beautiful and good children, and he saw all his grandchildren from birth and all remaining alive... And the end of his life was most brilliant: for when the Athenians had a war against their neighbours in Eleusis, coming to the rescue and making a rout of the enemy he died most beautifully, and the Athenians had buried him publicly right where he fell, and honoured him greatly.

His "perfect" life helps historians infer Ancient Greek ideals about the most honorable and mentionable way to live.

After describing Tellus as the happiest of all men, Solon states that the second-happiest men ever were the brothers Kleobis and Biton.

== See also ==
- Dulce et decorum est pro patria mori

== Bibliography ==
- Charis Patsis. New Greek Encyclopedia. vol. 21, p. 391.
