= Kleobis and Biton =

Legendary brothers in Greek mythology

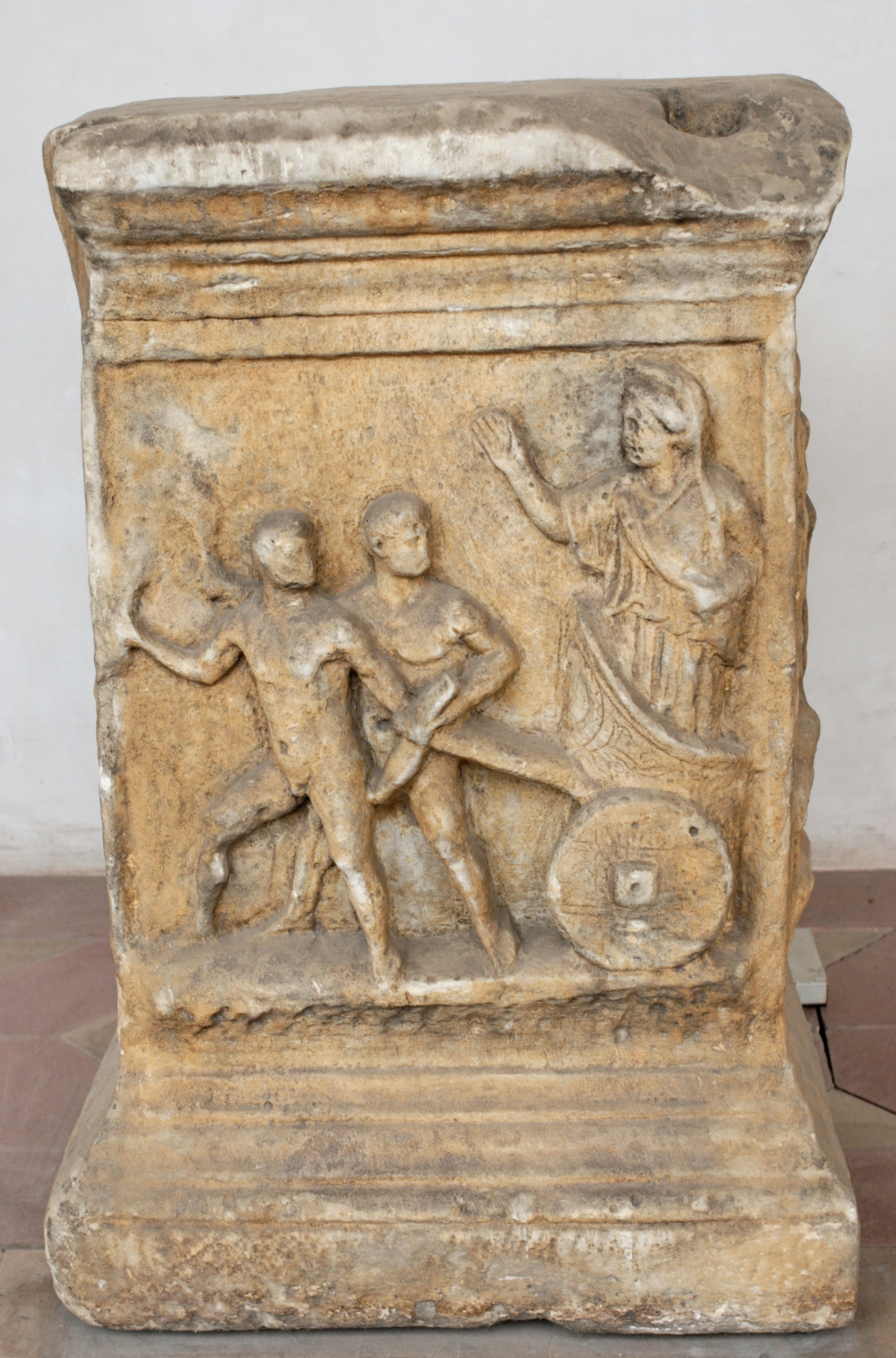
Marble altar depicting the myth of Kleobis and Biton.

Kleobis (Cleobis) and Biton (Ancient Greek: Κλέοβις, gen.: Κλεόβιδος; Βίτων, gen.: Βίτωνος) are two legendary brothers of Archaic Greece. They are identified with a pair of kouros statues discovered at Delphi which date to around 610 BCE. The earliest attestation of their legend appears later, in Herodotus's Histories of c. 440 BCE. The brothers were venerated in Argos for their extraordinary physical strength, filial devotion, and religious piety. Their commemoration and elevated status closely paralleled the traditions of a Greek hero cult.

The city of Argos rarely produced kouroi. Its citizens may have commissioned the statues of Kleobis and Biton and placed them at Delphi in part as civic propaganda.

== Legend ==
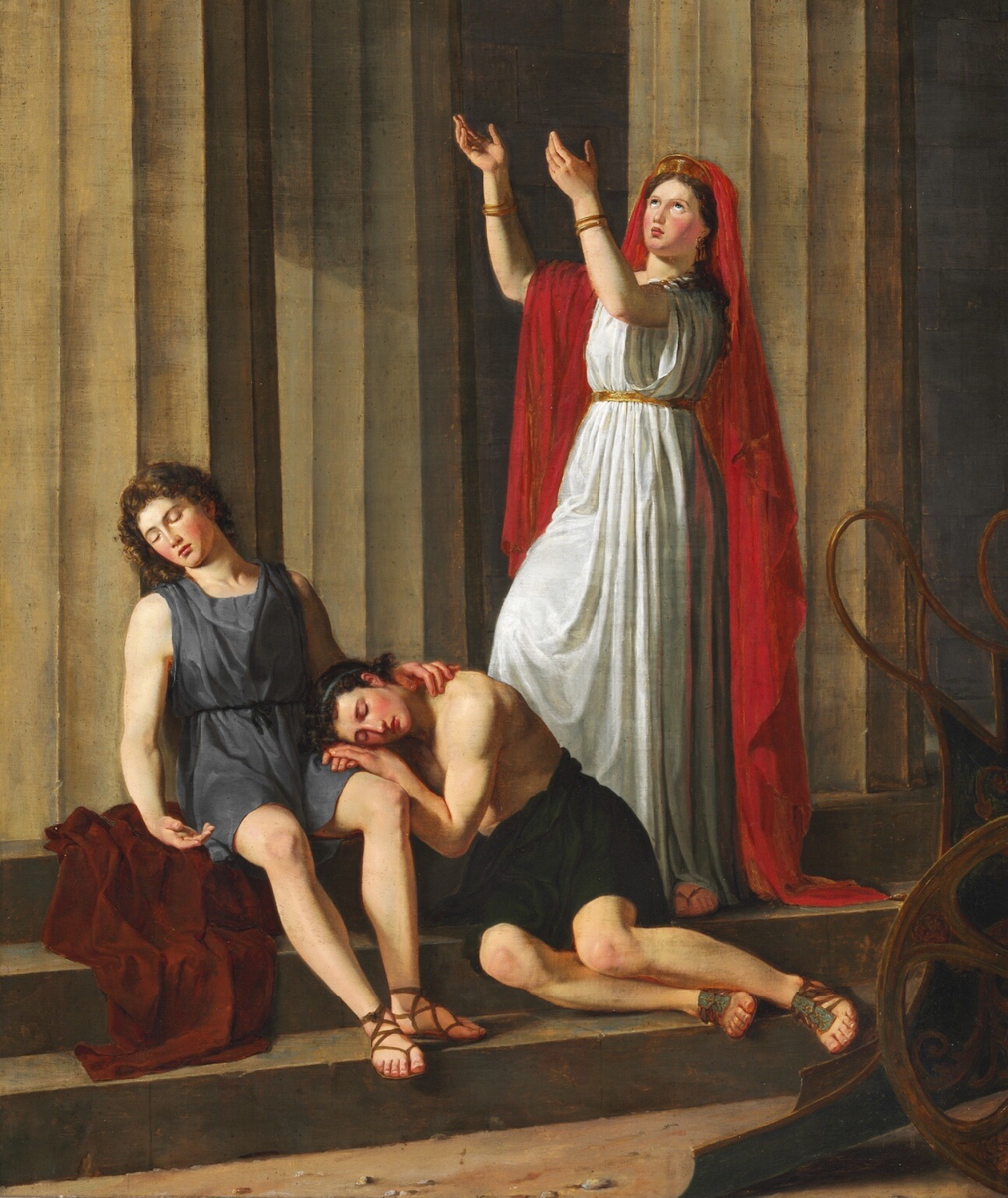
Kleobis and Biton by Adam Müller, 1830.

The legend of Kleobis and Biton is attested in Herodotus's account of a meeting between Croesus and Solon. When Croesus asks Solon whom he considers the happiest person in the world, Solon ranks Tellus of Athens first, followed by the Argive brothers Kleobis and Biton. Croesus asked Solon why his own vast wealth was ignored and why he had been omitted from the ranking. Solon then answers Croesus by recounting their story.

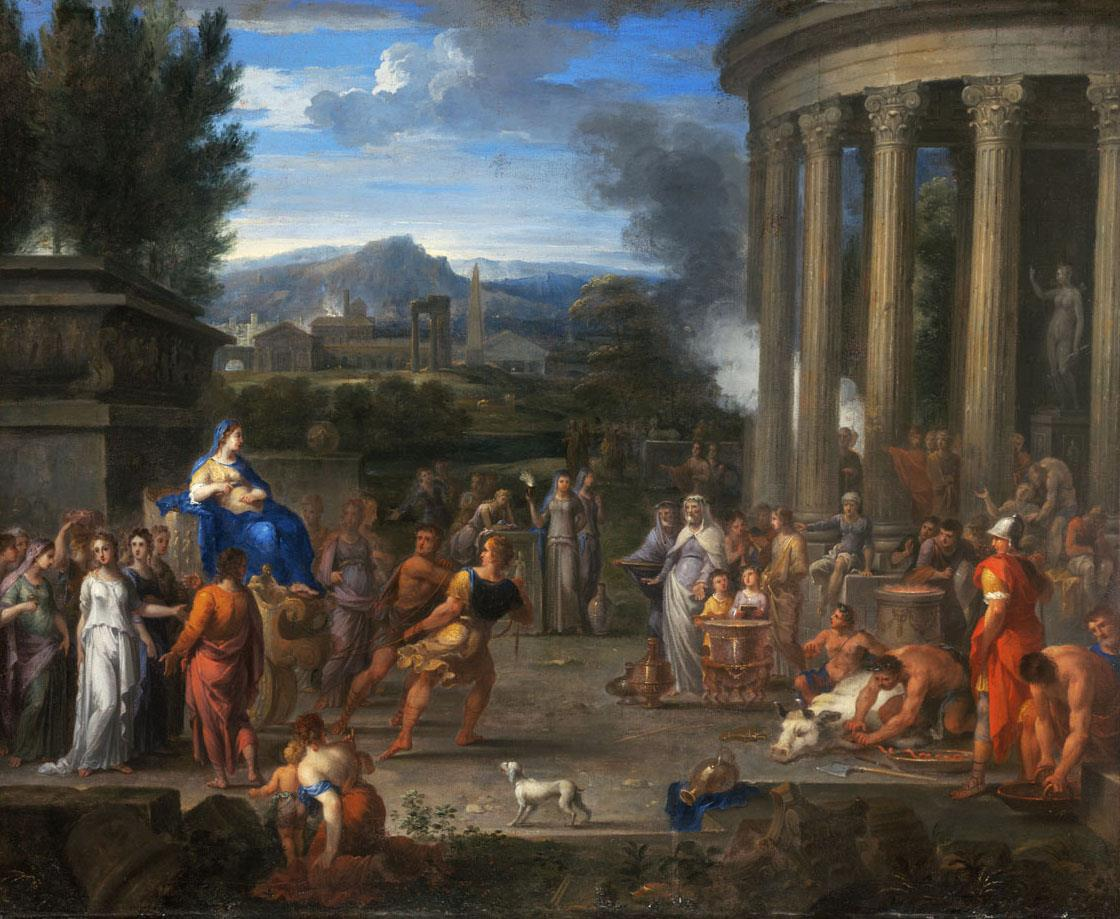
Cleobis and Biton, by Nicolas Loir

As Solon tells it, Kleobis and Biton were sons of Cydippe, a priestess at the temple of Hera in Argos. When Cydippe's oxen failed to arrive for a festival, the brothers yoked themselves to her cart and hauled it six miles to the temple. Moved by their devotion, Cydippe prayed for Hera to bestow the ultimate gift upon her sons. After the sacrifices, the brothers fell asleep in the temple and never awoke—a peaceful death at the peak of their youth. In their honor, the Argives dedicated two memorial statues at Apollo's sanctuary in Delphi. Solon concludes that no living person can be judged truly happy until death, demonstrating that a noble death can surpass a life of fleeting material wealth.

== Kouros statues ==
Herodotus records that "the Argives had statues of them made and set them up at Delphi, because they had been such excellent men". The two kouros statues recovered at Delphi are dated to c. 610 BCE and considered a typical specimen of the Archaic sculpture of the Peloponnese and of 6th century BCE Argive workshops. They are generally identified with Kleobis and Biton of Argos.

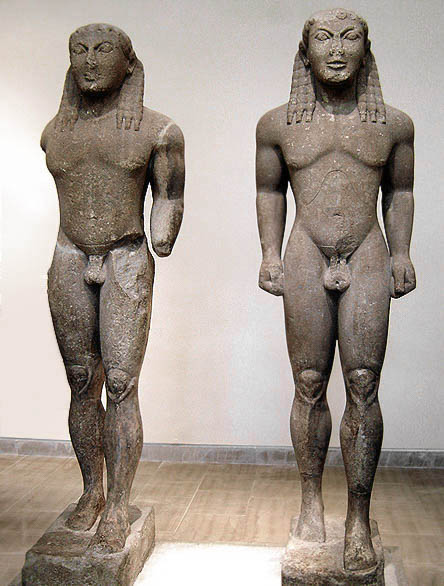
Kleobis and Biton, kouroi of the Archaic period, c. 580 BC. Delphi Archaeological Museum.

The statues are made of Parian marble and stand side by side on a shared base. A partial inscription states that the kouroi were made by the sculptor Polymedes of Argos and dedicated to Apollo by the citizens of Argos. Depicted as nude youths, each figure advances one leg forward with arms slightly bent and fists clenched. The statues are similar to other funerary monuments of the Archaic period which were placed by the families of slain warriors. The use of heroic nudity can be seen as "essentially unrealistic" while displaying their culture's "vivid interest in the postures of life deserting the heroic body."

== See also ==
- Excavations at Delphi
- Ancient Greek sculpture
- Agamedes and Trophonius, who were similarly rewarded by Apollo for building his temple.
