= Polymedes of Argos =

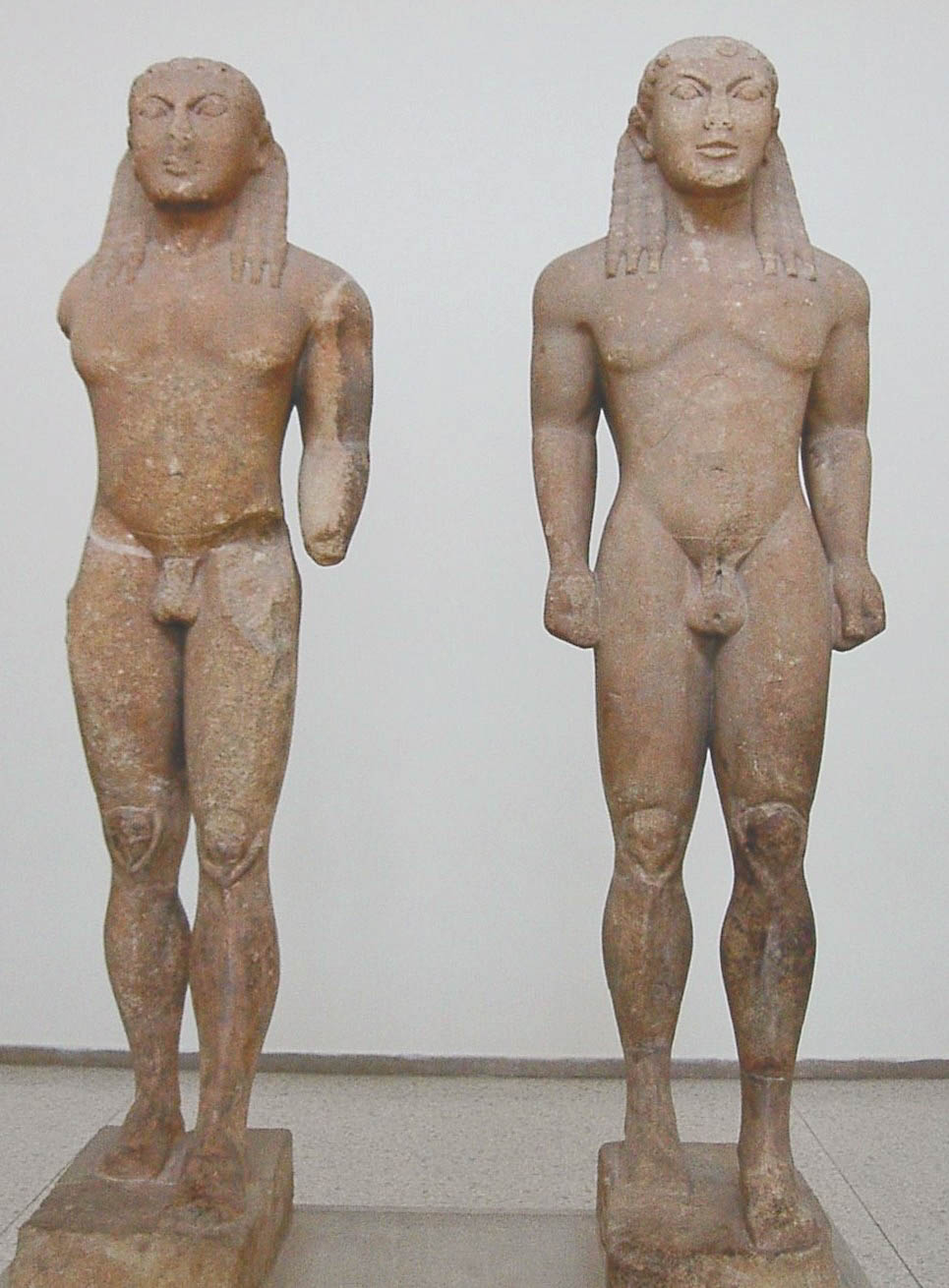
Kleobis and Biton (identified by inscriptions on the plinth) by Polymides of Argos, dedicated to Delphi by the city of Argos, Delphi Archaeological Museum, ca. 580 BC

Polymedes of Argos was a Greek sculptor of the Archaic Period (6th century BC). His exact dates of birth and death are unknown.

His life is little known. His most famous known work is the statues of Kleobis and Biton (Ancient Greek: Κλέοβις, gen.: Κλεόβιδος; Βίτων, gen.: Βίτωνος), which are the names of two human brothers in Greek mythology. These statues now reside in the Delphi Archaeological Museum, at Delphi, Greece. The statues date from about 580 BC and come from Argos in the Peloponnese, although they were found at Delphi. The second part of Polymedes' name is legible on the inscription that is divided on the plinths of the two statues.
